= Sofia Peak =

Ice covered peak in Antarctica

Location of Tangra Mountains on Livingston Island in the South Shetland Islands

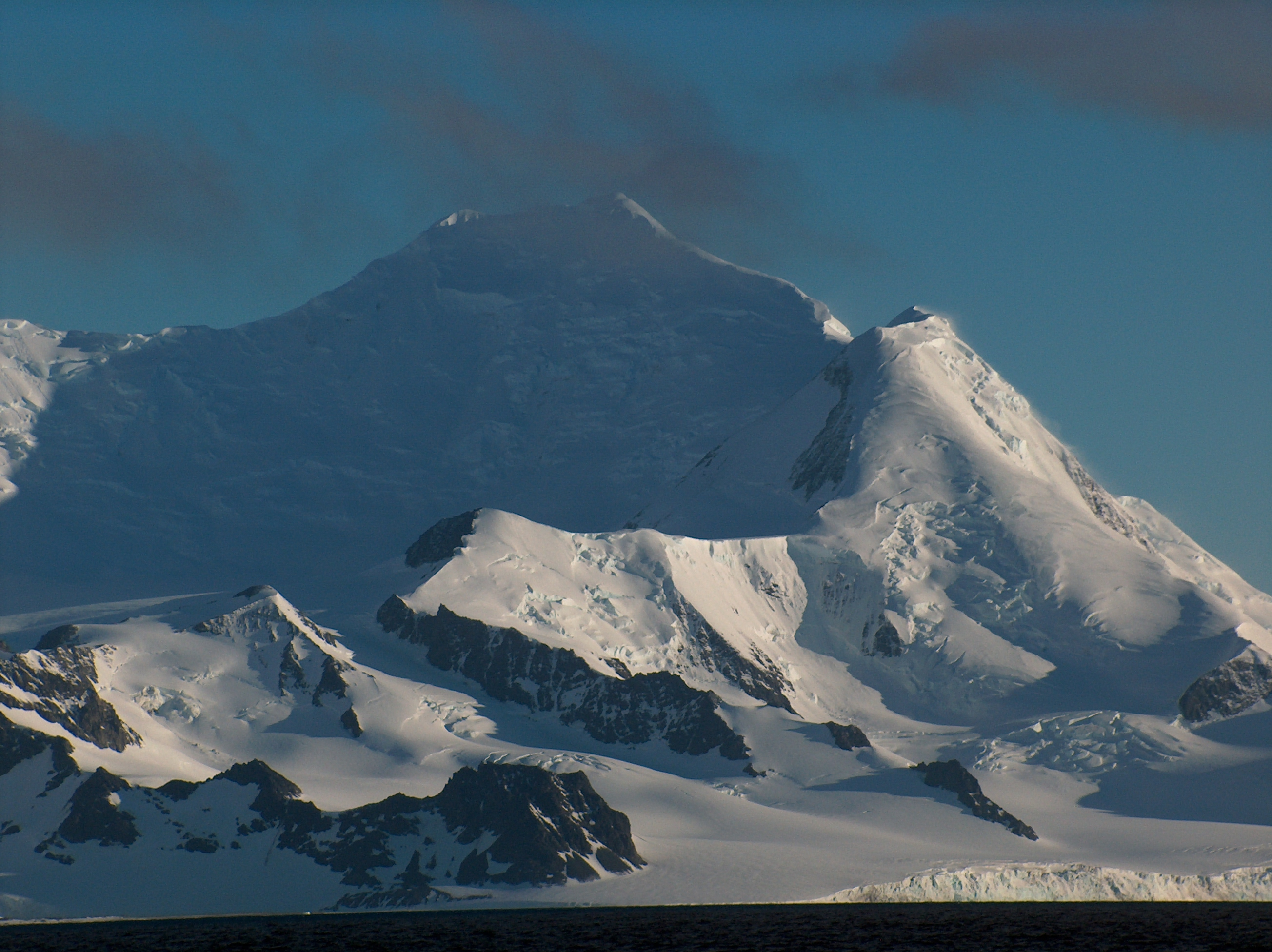
The twin summit of Sofia and Great Needle Peaks from Bransfield Strait

Topographic map of Livingston Island and Smith Island

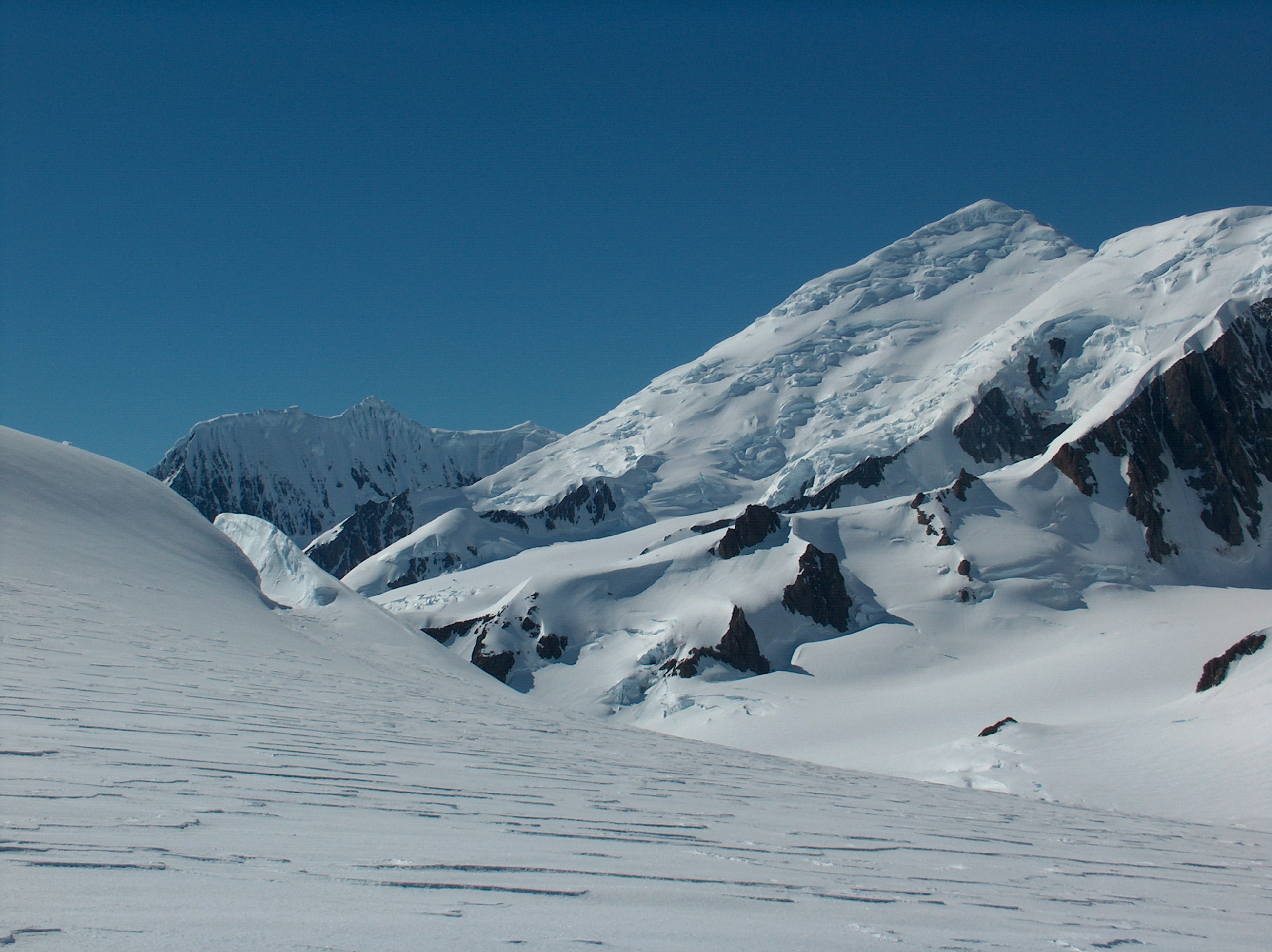
Sofia Peak from Kuzman Knoll, with Helmet Peak in the background

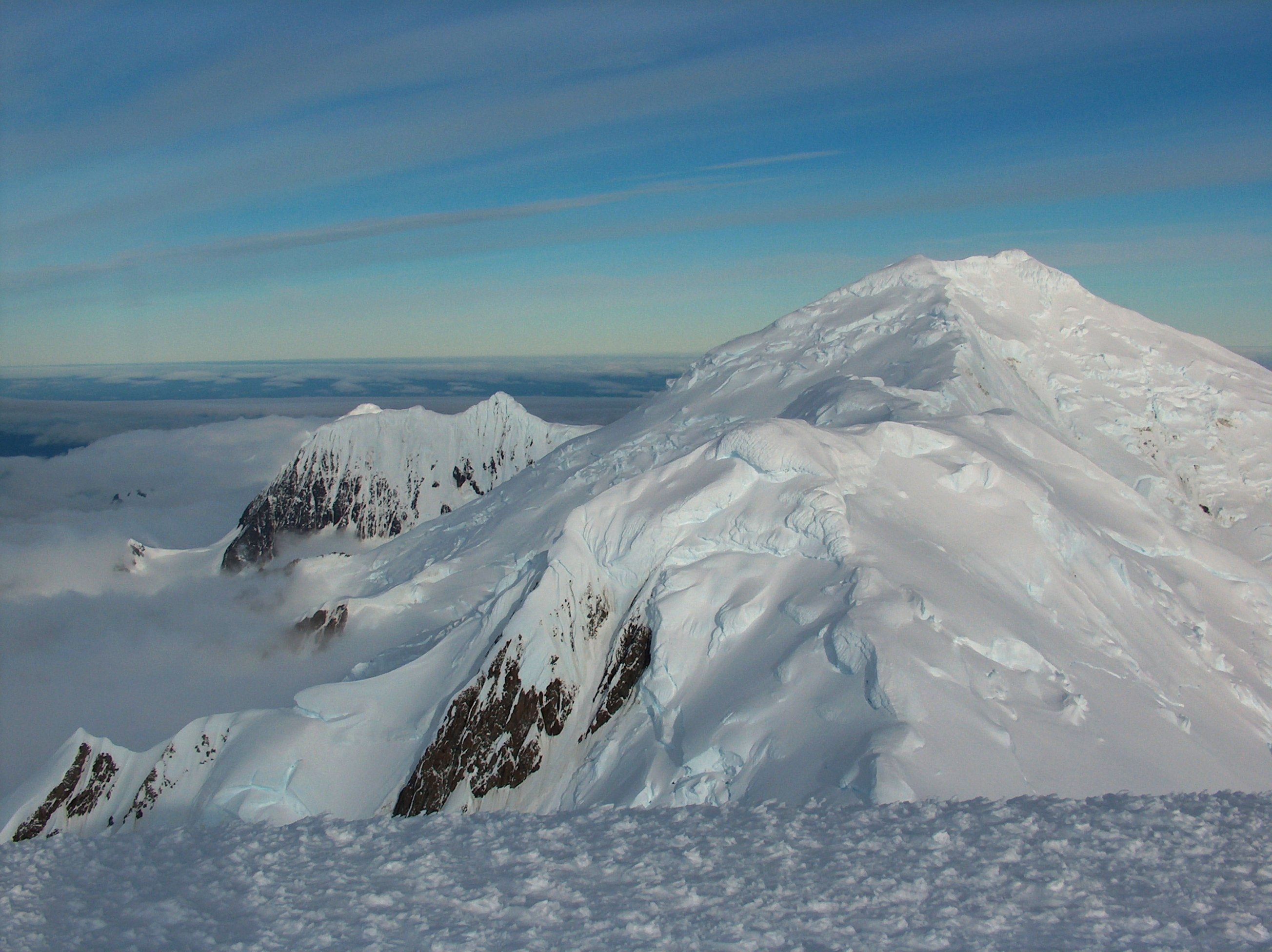
The twin peak of Sofia and Great Needle Peaks from Lyaskovets Peak, with Levski Peak in the foreground and Helmet Peak in the left background

Sofia Peak (Bulgarian: връх София, romanized: vrah Sofiya, IPA: [ˈvrɤx ˈsɔfijɐ]) is the ice-covered peak rising to 1655 m in Levski Ridge, central Tangra Mountains on Livingston Island in the South Shetland Islands, Antarctica, 470 m northwest of the summit point of Great Needle Peak with which it forms a twin peak. The feature is named after the capital city of Bulgaria.

== History ==
The first ascent and GPS survey of Sofia Peak was made on 8 January 2015 by the Bulgarian mountaineers Doychin Boyanov, Nikolay Petkov and Aleksander Shopov from Camp Academia locality (541 m) via Lozen Saddle (437 m) and Plana Peak (740 m).

== Location ==
Sofia Peak is located at 62°40′04.2″S 60°03′44.6″W, which is 3 km northeast of Silistra Knoll, 1.25 km east-southeast of St. Ivan Rilski Col, 1.84 km south-southeast Plana Peak, 1.6 km south of Tutrakan Peak and 2.23 km southwest of Helmet Peak. Bulgarian mapping in 2005, 2009 and 2017.

== Maps ==
- L.L. Ivanov et al. Antarctica: Livingston Island and Greenwich Island, South Shetland Islands. Scale 1:100000 topographic map. Sofia: Antarctic Place-names Commission of Bulgaria, 2005
- L.L. Ivanov. Antarctica: Livingston Island and Greenwich, Robert, Snow and Smith Islands. Scale 1:120000 topographic map. Troyan: Manfred Wörner Foundation, 2009
- L.L. Ivanov. Antarctica: Livingston Island and Smith Island. Scale 1:100000 topographic map. Manfred Wörner Foundation, 2017
- Antarctic Digital Database (ADD). Scale 1:250000 topographic map of Antarctica. Scientific Committee on Antarctic Research (SCAR). Since 1993, regularly upgraded and updated
- A. Kamburov and L. Ivanov. Bowles Ridge and Central Tangra Mountains: Livingston Island, Antarctica. Scale 1:25000 map. Sofia: Manfred Wörner Foundation, 2023. ISBN 978-619-90008-6-1
