= Great Needle Peak =

Mountain in the South Shetland Islands, Antarctica

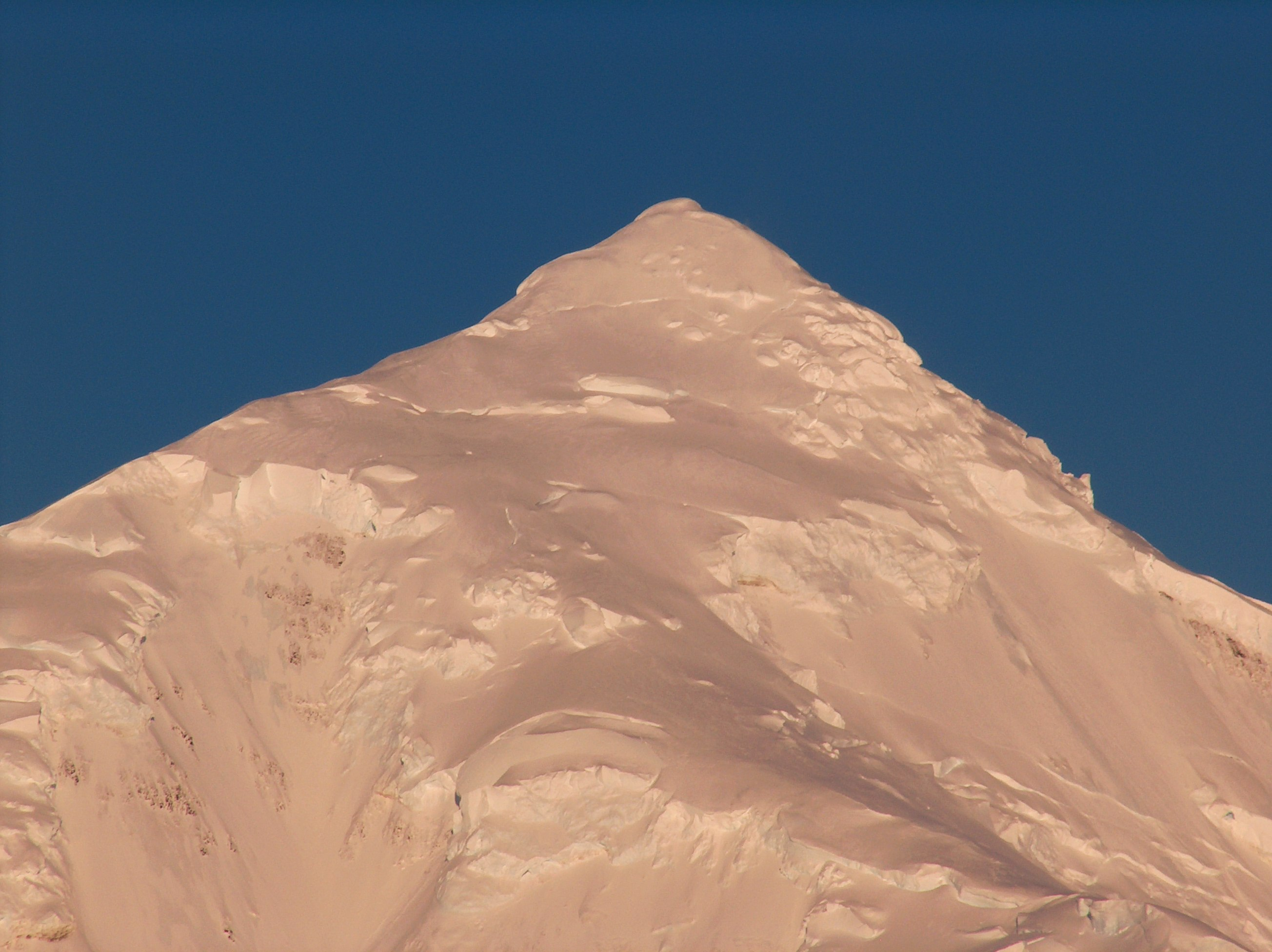
- Great Needle Peak from Bransfield Strait

Highest point
- Elevation: 1,679.5 metres (5,510 feet)
- Prominence: ca. 480 metres (1,575 feet) (key col Shipka Saddle)
- Coordinates: 62°40′11″S 60°03′15″W

Geography
- Location of Tangra Mountains on Livingston Island in the South Shetland Islands
- Location: Livingston Island, Antarctica
- Parent range: Tangra Mountains

Climbing
- First ascent: 8 January 2015 Doychin Boyanov, Nikolay Petkov, and Aleksander Shopov

Great Needle Peak (Bulgarian: Голям Иглен връх, romanized: Golyam Iglen vrah, IPA: [ɡoˈʎam ˈiɡlɛn ˈvrɤx]; variant name in Spanish: pico Falsa Aguja, lit. 'False Needle Peak') is the summit of the central Levski Ridge in Tangra Mountains on Livingston Island, Antarctica. Rising to 1,679.5 m, it is the third highest peak of both the mountains and the island after Mount Friesland (1700.2 m) and St. Boris Peak (1685 m). Great Needle Peak surmounts Huron Glacier and its tributary draining Devnya Valley to the north, Magura Glacier to the east, Srebarna Glacier to the south, and Macy Glacier to the southwest.

== History ==
The peak's name derives from the Spanish name form pico Falsa Aguja (False Needle Peak) that probably dates back to 1957, with ‘great’ becoming established in usage and considered more suitable than ‘false’ as this heavily glaciated, major peak could hardly be associated with the ‘true’ Needle Peak (pico Aguja), a sharp rocky peak of elevation just 370 m situated near Samuel Point 8 km away.

The first ascent and GPS survey of Great Needle Peak was made on 8 January 2015 by the Bulgarian mountaineers Doychin Boyanov, Nikolay Petkov and Aleksander Shopov from Camp Academia locality (541 m) via Lozen Saddle (437 m) and Plana Peak (740 m). Their measured peak elevation of 1,679.5 m) updated the previously existing estimate (1,690 m according to the Bulgarian topographic survey Tangra 2004/05), and confirmed that the summit of both the mountains and the island is indeed the 1700.2 m high Mount Friesland.

== Location ==
The peak is located 6.7 km east of Mount Friesland, 3.32 km east by south of Levski Peak, 2.21 km south-southeast of Plana Peak, 2.54 km south of Sitalk Peak and 1.84 km south of Tutrakan Peak, 2.15 km southwest of Helmet Peak, 3.32 km northwest of M'Kean Point, 1.29 km north of Serdica Peak, and 470 m southeast of Sofia Peak (1655 m) with which it forms a twin peak.

== Maps ==
- Chart of South Shetland including Coronation Island, &c. from the exploration of the sloop Dove in the years 1821 and 1822 by George Powell, Commander of the same. Scale ca. 1:200000. London: Laurie, 1822
- South Shetland Islands. Scale 1:200000 topographic map. DOS 610 Sheet W 62 60. Tolworth, UK, 1968.
- Islas Livingston y Decepción. Mapa topográfico a escala 1:100000. Madrid: Servicio Geográfico del Ejército, 1991.
- S. Soccol, D. Gildea, and J. Bath. Livingston Island, Antarctica. Scale 1:100000 satellite map. The Omega Foundation, USA, 2004.
- L.L. Ivanov et al., Antarctica: Livingston Island and Greenwich Island, South Shetland Islands (from English Strait to Morton Strait, with illustrations and ice-cover distribution), 1:100000 scale topographic map, Antarctic Place-names Commission of Bulgaria, Sofia, 2005
- L.L. Ivanov. Antarctica: Livingston Island and Greenwich, Robert, Snow and Smith Islands. Scale 1:120000 topographic map. Troyan: Manfred Wörner Foundation, 2010. ISBN 978-954-92032-9-5 (First edition 2009. ISBN 978-954-92032-6-4)
- Antarctic Digital Database (ADD). Scale 1:250000 topographic map of Antarctica. Scientific Committee on Antarctic Research (SCAR). Since 1993, regularly upgraded and updated.
- L.L. Ivanov. Antarctica: Livingston Island and Smith Island. Scale 1:100000 topographic map. Manfred Wörner Foundation, 2017. ISBN 978-619-90008-3-0
- A. Kamburov and L. Ivanov. Bowles Ridge and Central Tangra Mountains: Livingston Island, Antarctica. Scale 1:25000 map. Sofia: Manfred Wörner Foundation, 2023. ISBN 978-619-90008-6-1

== See also ==
- Tangra Mountains
- Livingston Island
- South Shetland Islands
- Antarctica

== Gallery ==
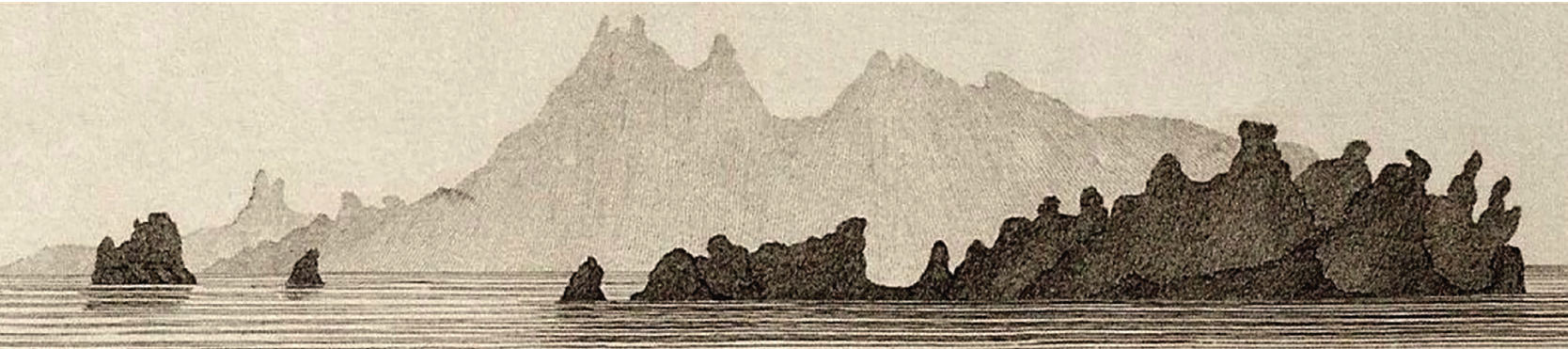
North view of Tangra Mountains depicting (left to right) Great Needle Peak, Levski Peak, Lyaskovets Peak, Mount Friesland, St. Boris Peak and Simeon Peak, with Desolation Island in the foreground; fragment of an illustration to George Powell's 1822 chart of the South Shetland Islands

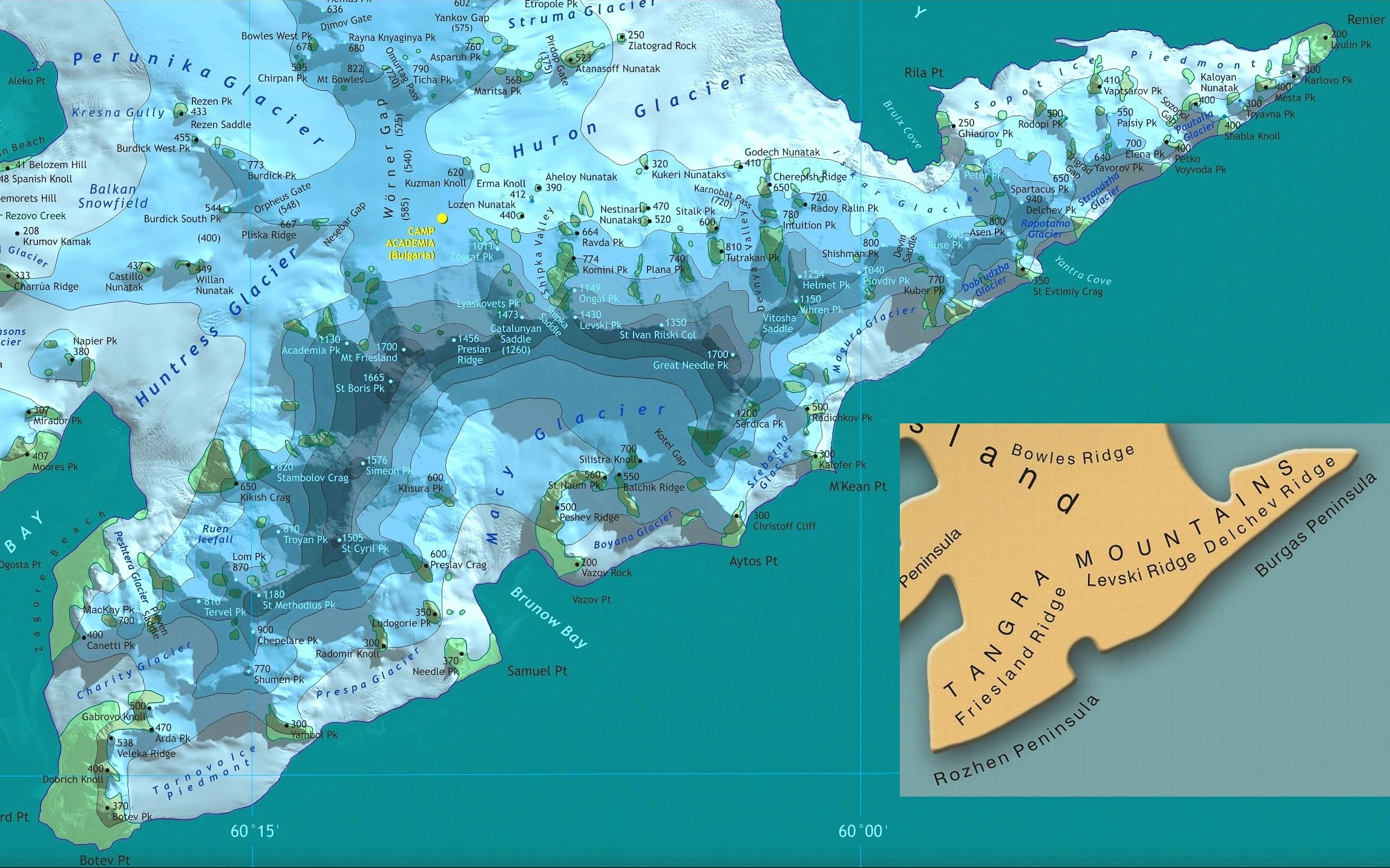
Map of Tangra Mountains

Topographic map of Livingston Island and Smith Island

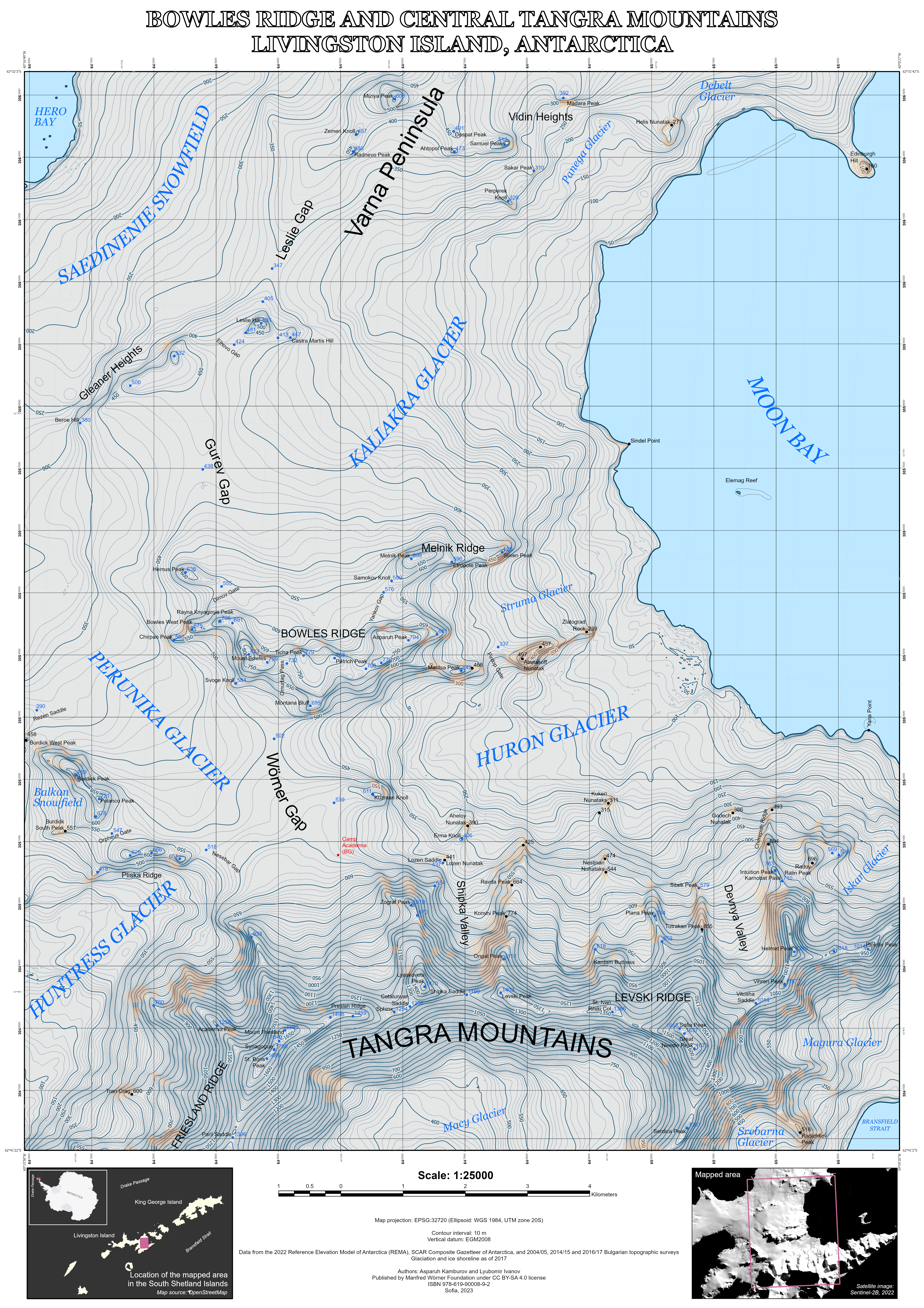
Topographic map of Bowles Ridge and Central Tangra Mountains

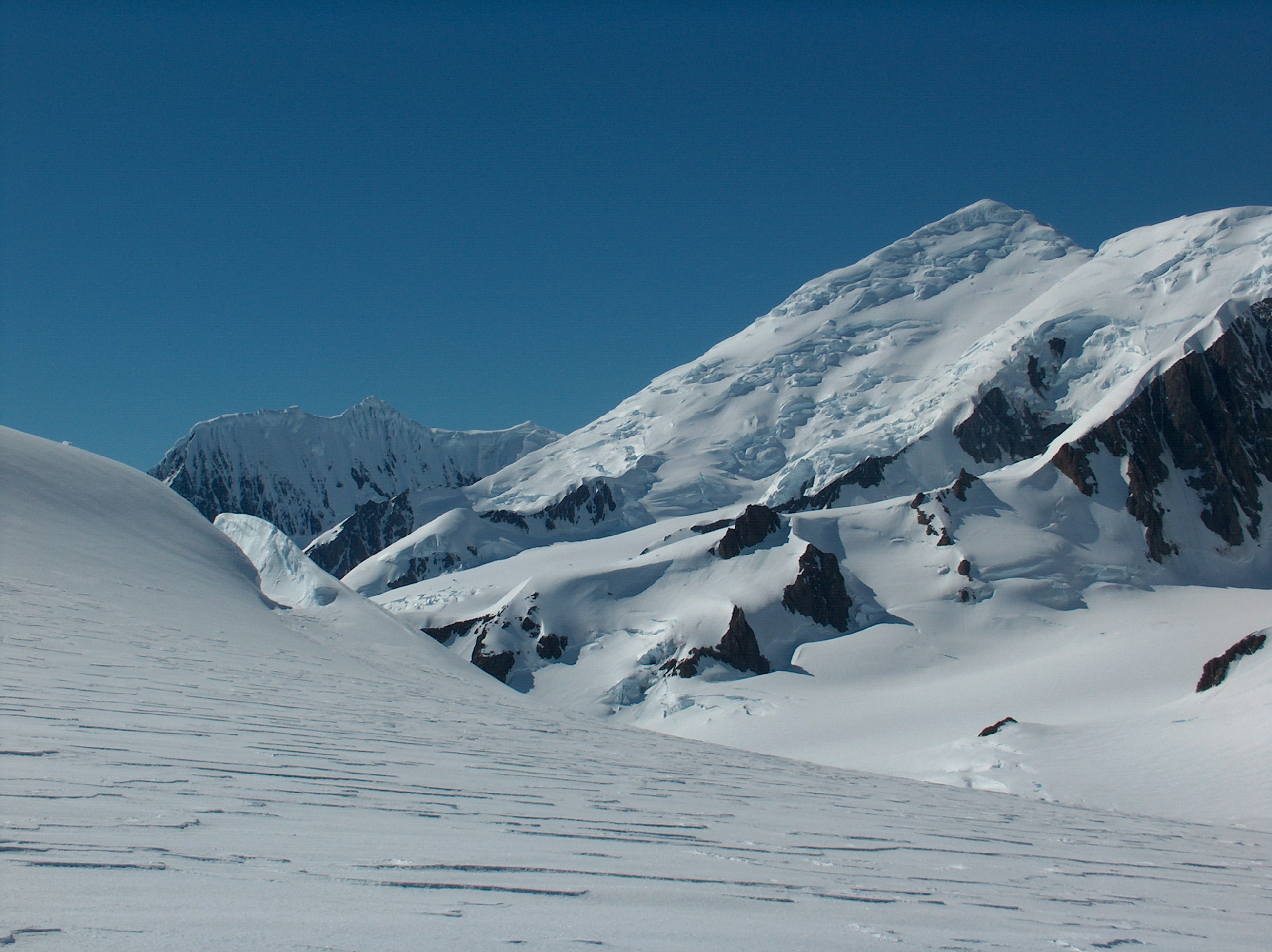
Great Needle Peak from Kuzman Knoll, with Helmet Peak in the left background

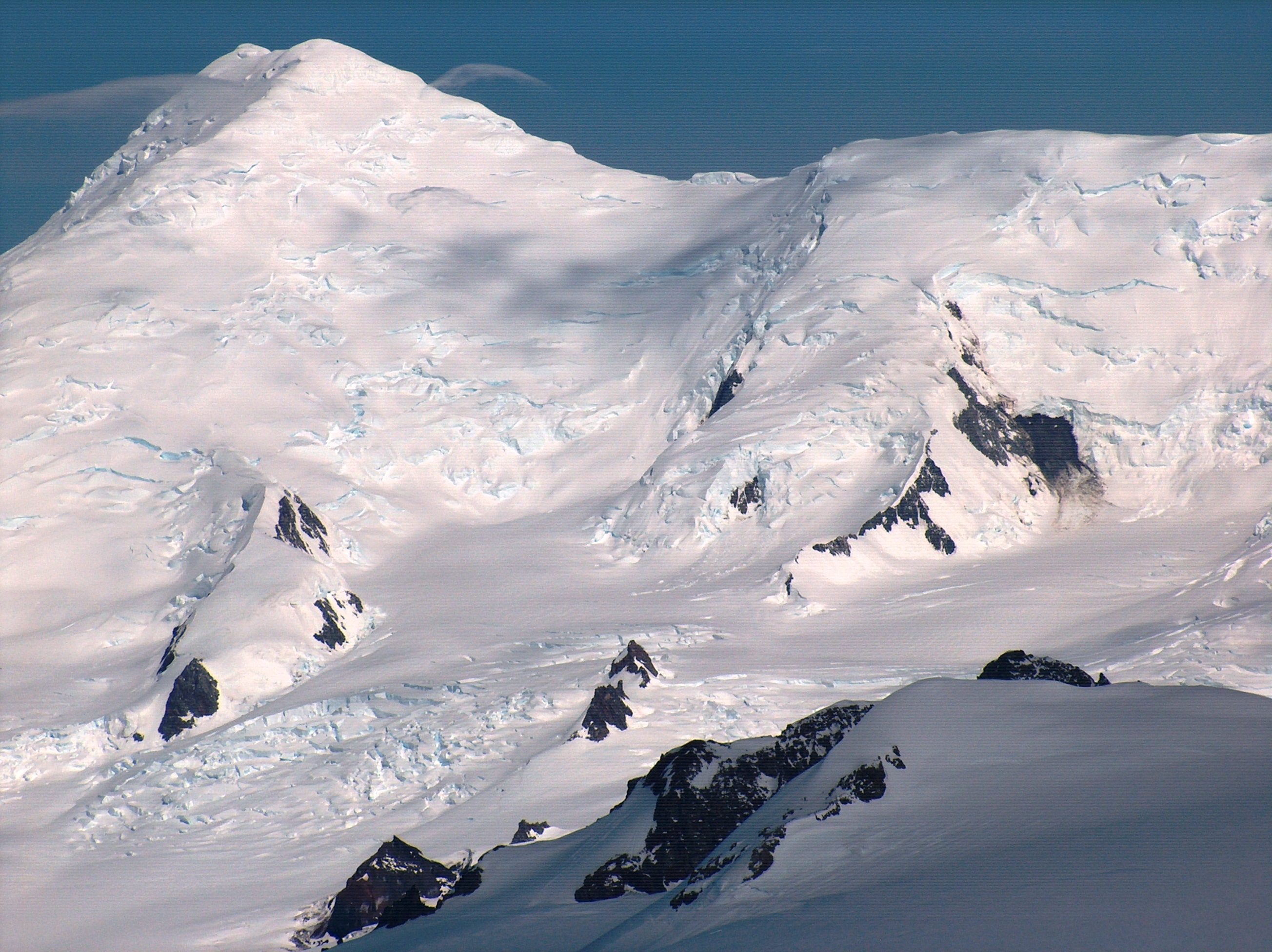
Great Needle Peak from Miziya Peak, with Sliven Peak and Atanasov Nunatak in the foreground, Huron Glacier with Kukeri Nunataks and Nestinari Nunataks in the middle, and Great Needle Peak and St. Ivan Rilski Col surmounting Plana Peak and Kardam Buttress in the background

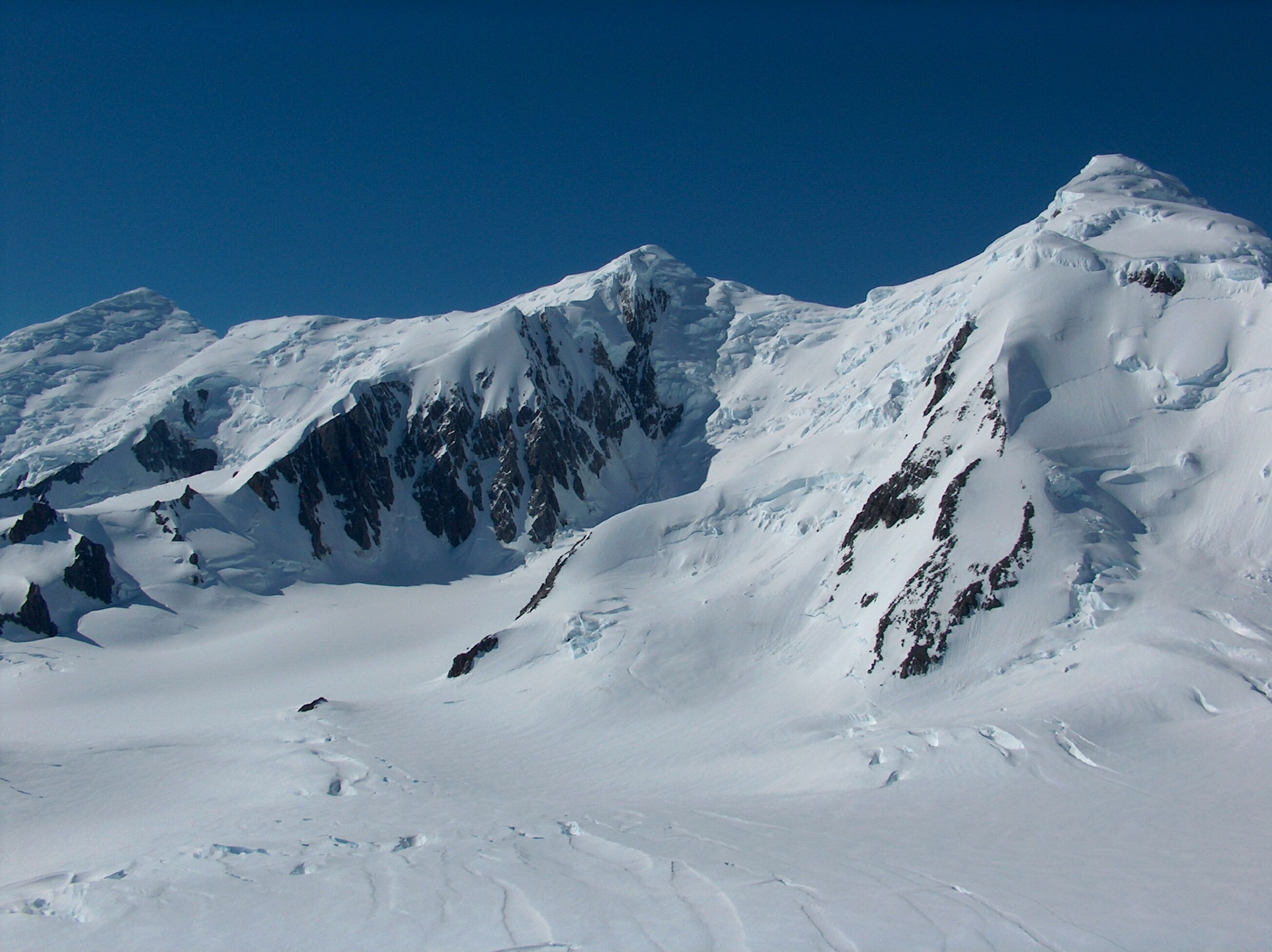
Central Tangra Mountains, from left to right Great Needle Peak, Levski Peak and Lyaskovets Peak

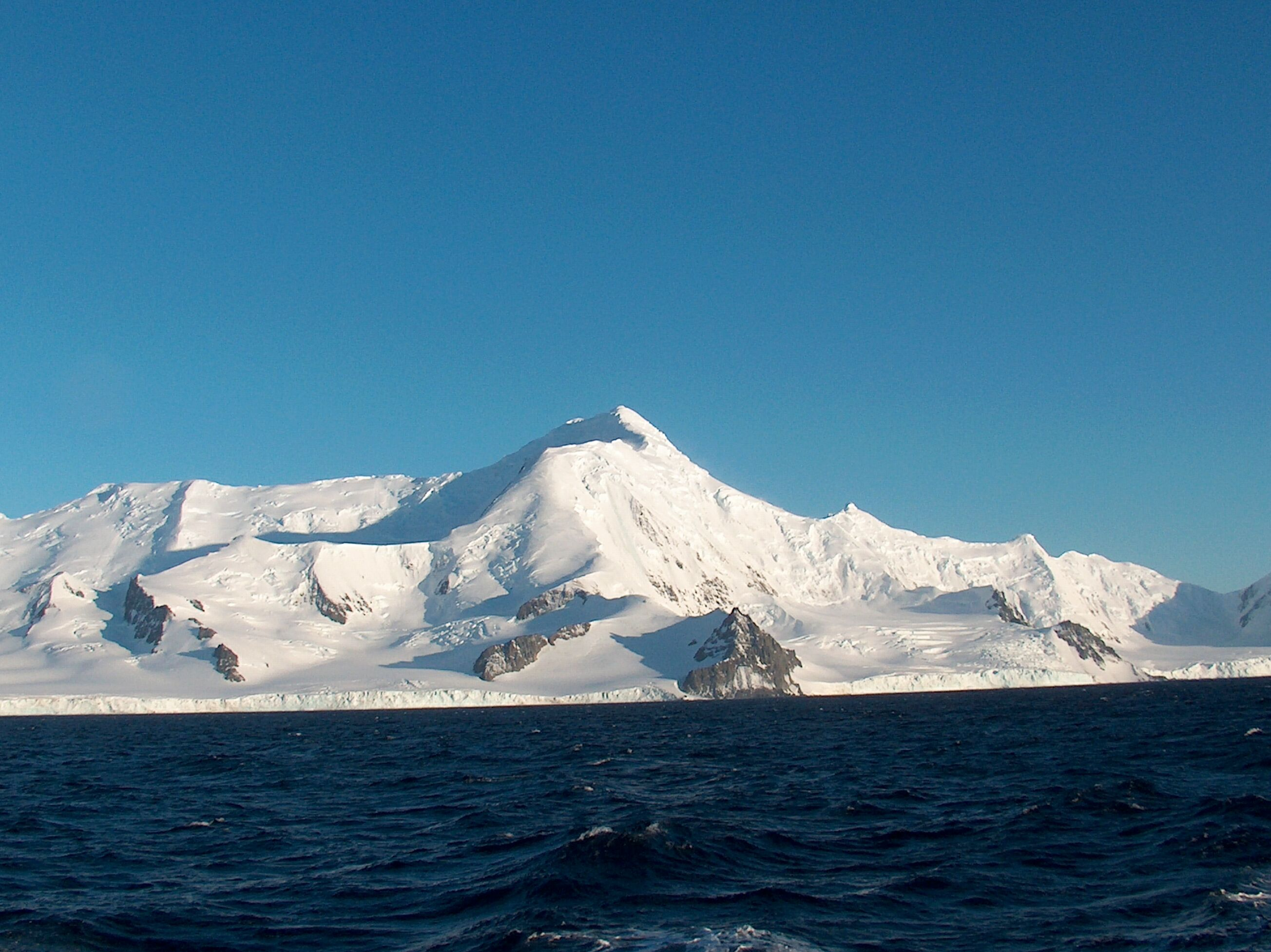
Levski Ridge from Bransfield Strait, with Great Needle Peak in the centre.

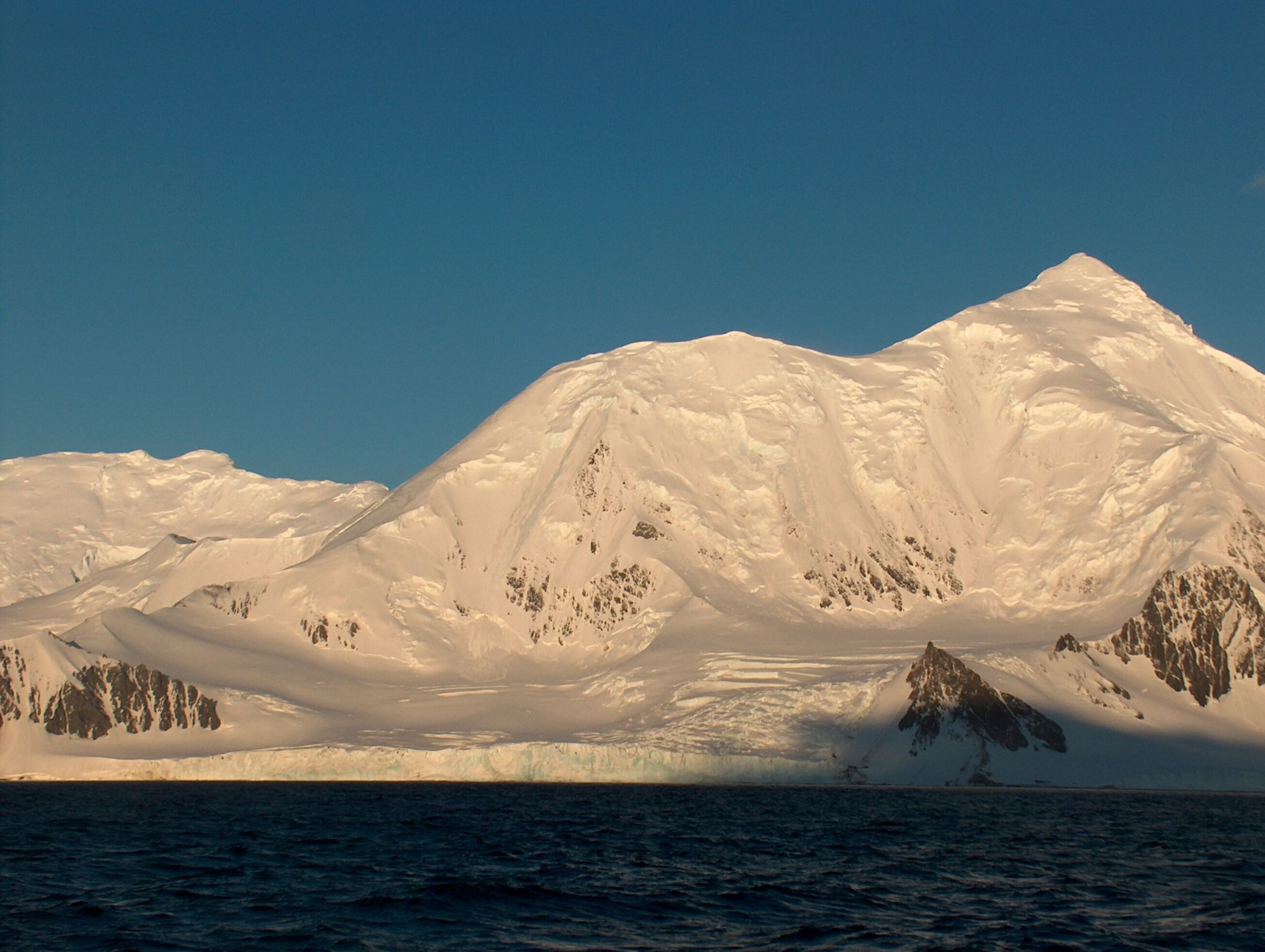
Great Needle Peak from Bransfield Strait, with Serdica Peak in the middle and Mount Friesland in the left background

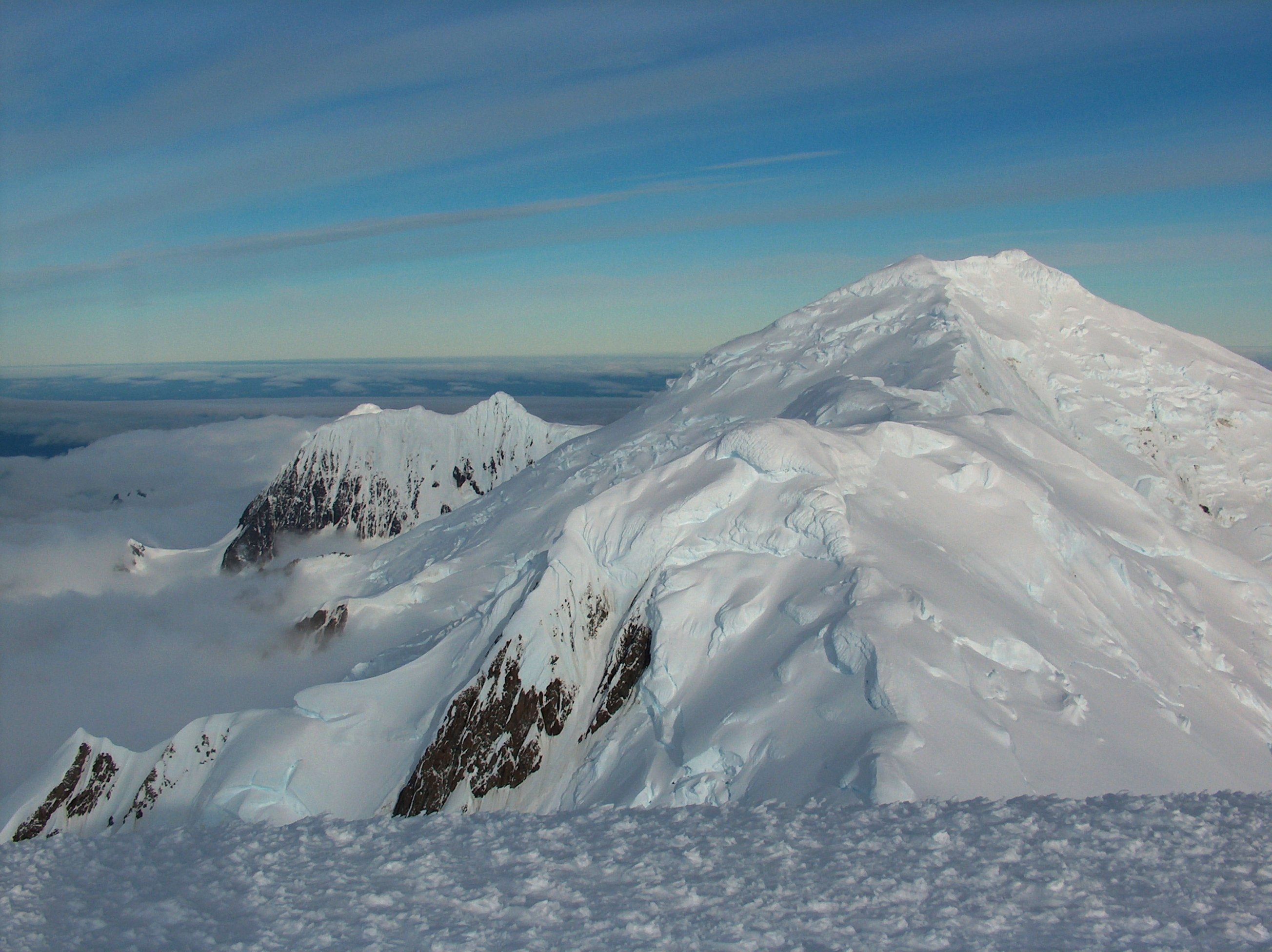
The twin peak of Sofia Peak and Great Needle Peak from Lyaskovets Peak, with Levski Peak in the foreground and Helmet Peak in the left background

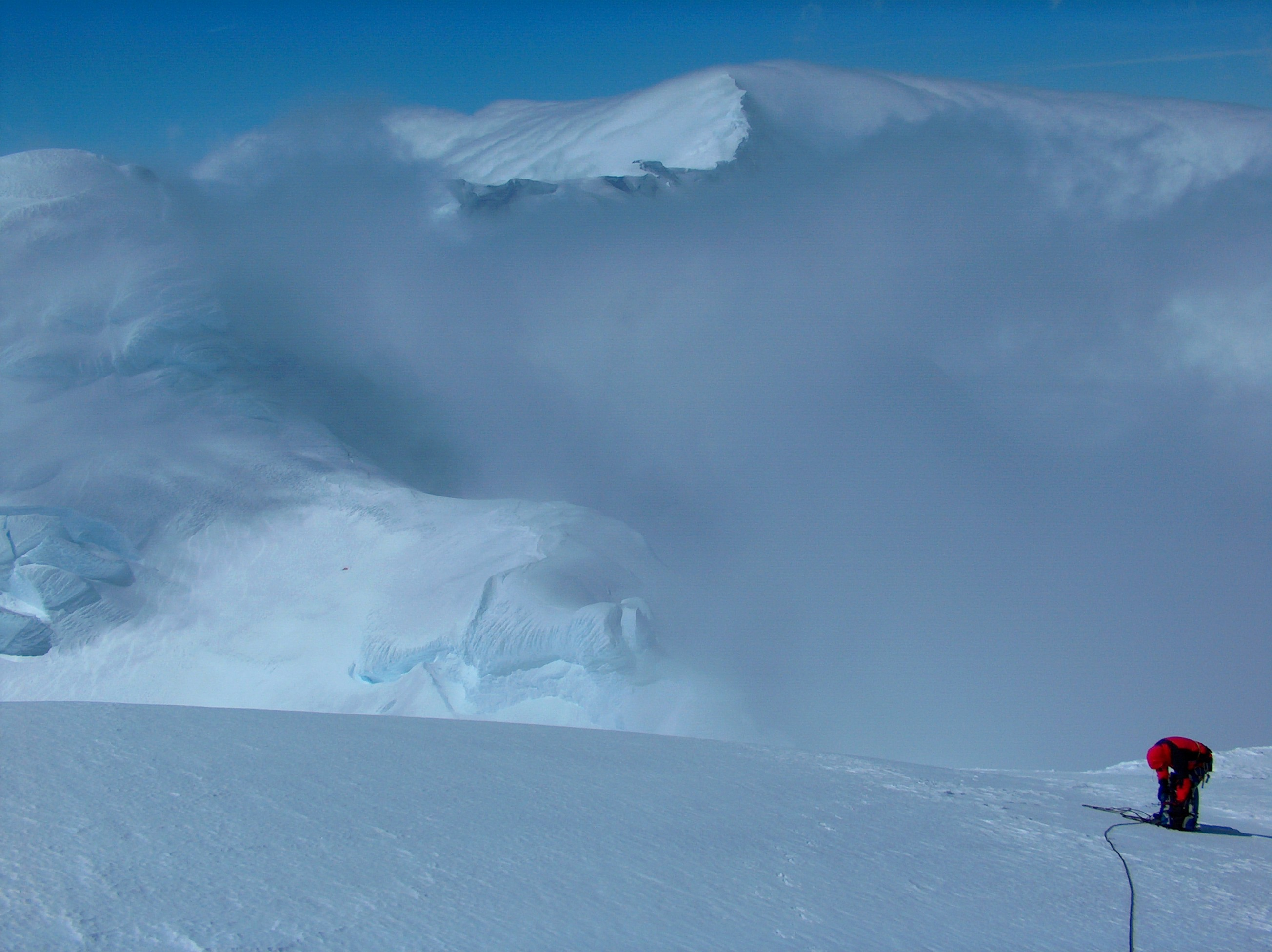
On the crest of Tangra Mountains, a view from Presian Ridge east towards Catalunyan Saddle (with the bivouac of Tangra 2004/05 Survey), Lyaskovets Peak is on the left, and St. Ivan Rilski Col and Great Needle Peak in the background

== Notes ==
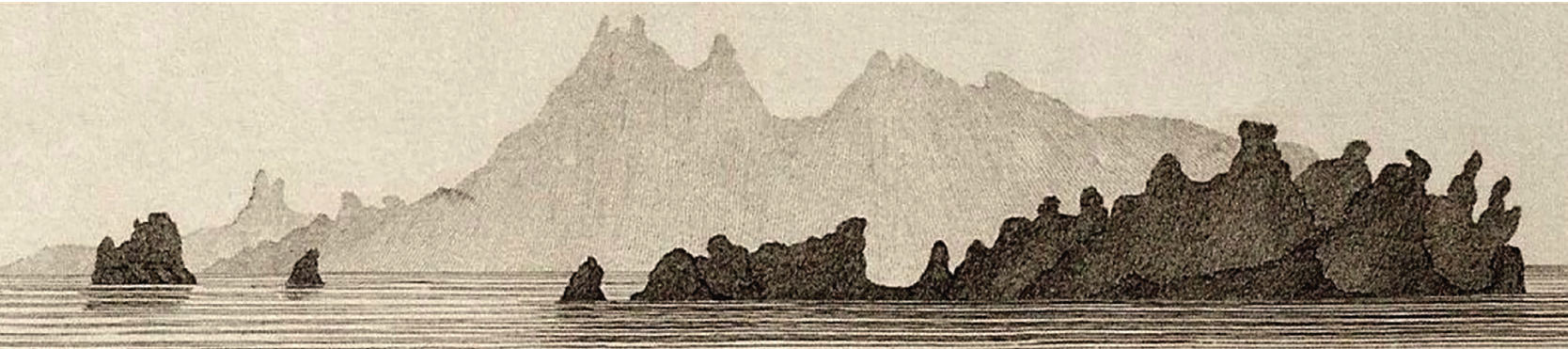
North view of Tangra Mountains depicting (left to right) Great Needle Peak, Levski Peak, Lyaskovets Peak, Mount Friesland, St. Boris Peak and Simeon Peak, with Desolation Island in the foreground; fragment of an illustration to George Powell's 1822 chart of the South Shetland and South Orkney Islands
