= Tutrakan Peak =

Mountain Peak in Northeastern Bulgaria

Location of Tangra Mountains on Livingston Island in the South Shetland Islands.

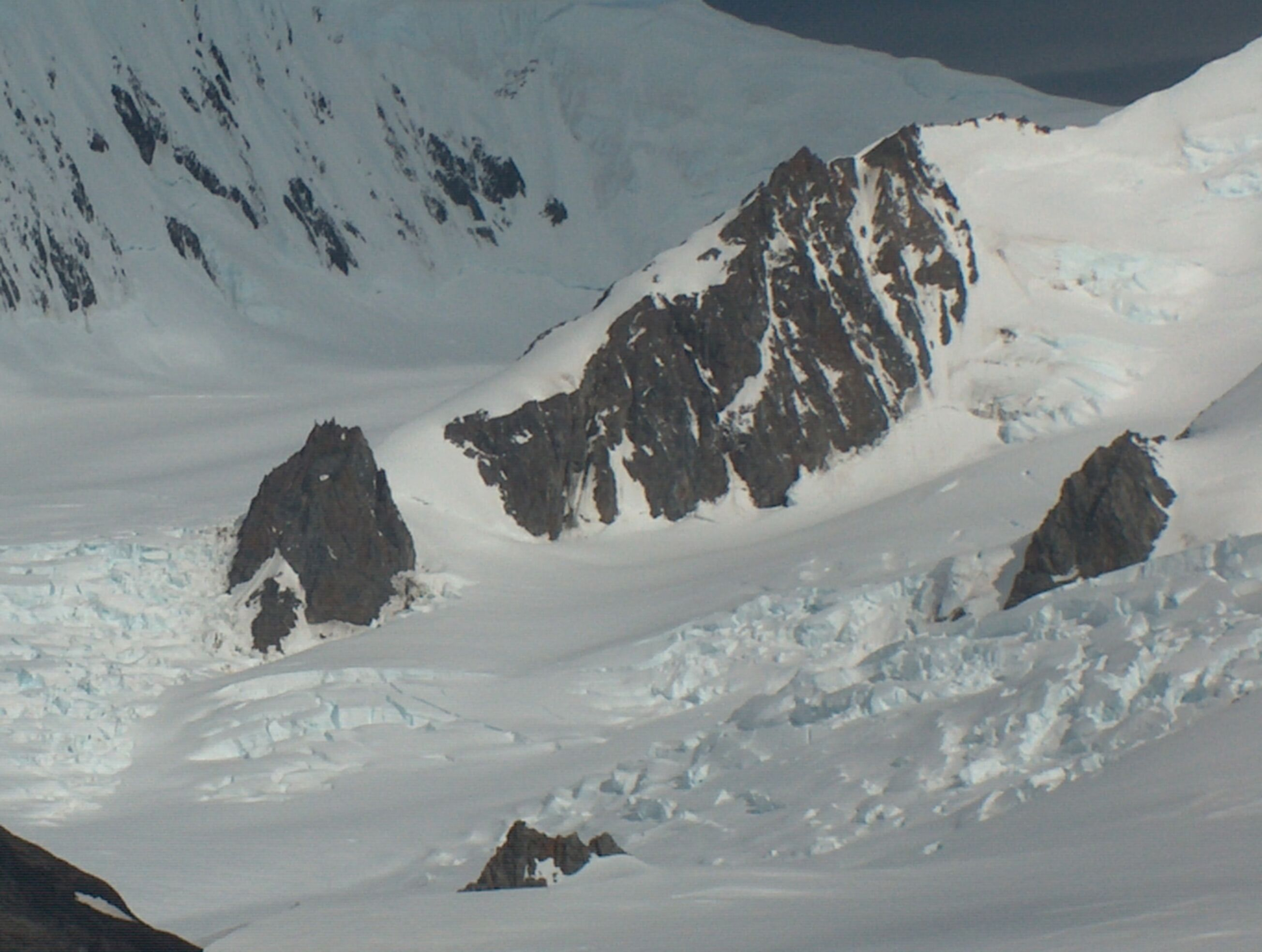
Tutrakan Peak from the southern foothills of Petrich Peak.

Topographic map of Livingston Island and Smith Island.

Tutrakan Peak (Bulgarian: връх Тутракан, romanized: vrah Tutrakan, IPA: [ˈvrɤx ˈtutrɐkɐn]) is a rocky peak of 810 m in the Levski Ridge of the Tangra Mountains on Livingston Island in the South Shetland Islands, Antarctica surmounting Devnya Valley to the east, and Huron Glacier and its tributaries to the north and west. The peak is named after the town of Tutrakan in northeastern Bulgaria.

== Location ==
The peak is located at 62°39′11.8″S 60°03′25.5″W, which is 1.84 km north of Great Needle Peak (Falsa Aguja Peak), 1.93 km northeast of the summit of St. Ivan Rilski Col, 800 m east-southeast of Plana Peak, 700 m south of Sitalk Peak, 1.51 km southwest of Intuition Peak and 1.66 km west-northwest of Helmet Peak.

The peak was surveyed in the Bulgarian topographic survey Tangra 2004/05 and mapped in 2005 and 2009.

== Maps ==
- L.L. Ivanov et al. Antarctica: Livingston Island and Greenwich Island, South Shetland Islands. Scale 1:100000 topographic map. Sofia: Antarctic Place-names Commission of Bulgaria, 2005.
- L.L. Ivanov. Antarctica: Livingston Island and Greenwich, Robert, Snow and Smith Islands. Scale 1:120000 topographic map. Troyan: Manfred Wörner Foundation, 2009. ISBN 978-954-92032-6-4
- A. Kamburov and L. Ivanov. Bowles Ridge and Central Tangra Mountains: Livingston Island, Antarctica. Scale 1:25000 map. Sofia: Manfred Wörner Foundation, 2023. ISBN 978-619-90008-6-1
