= Lyaskovets Peak =

Mountain in Livingston Island, South Shetland Islands, Antarctica

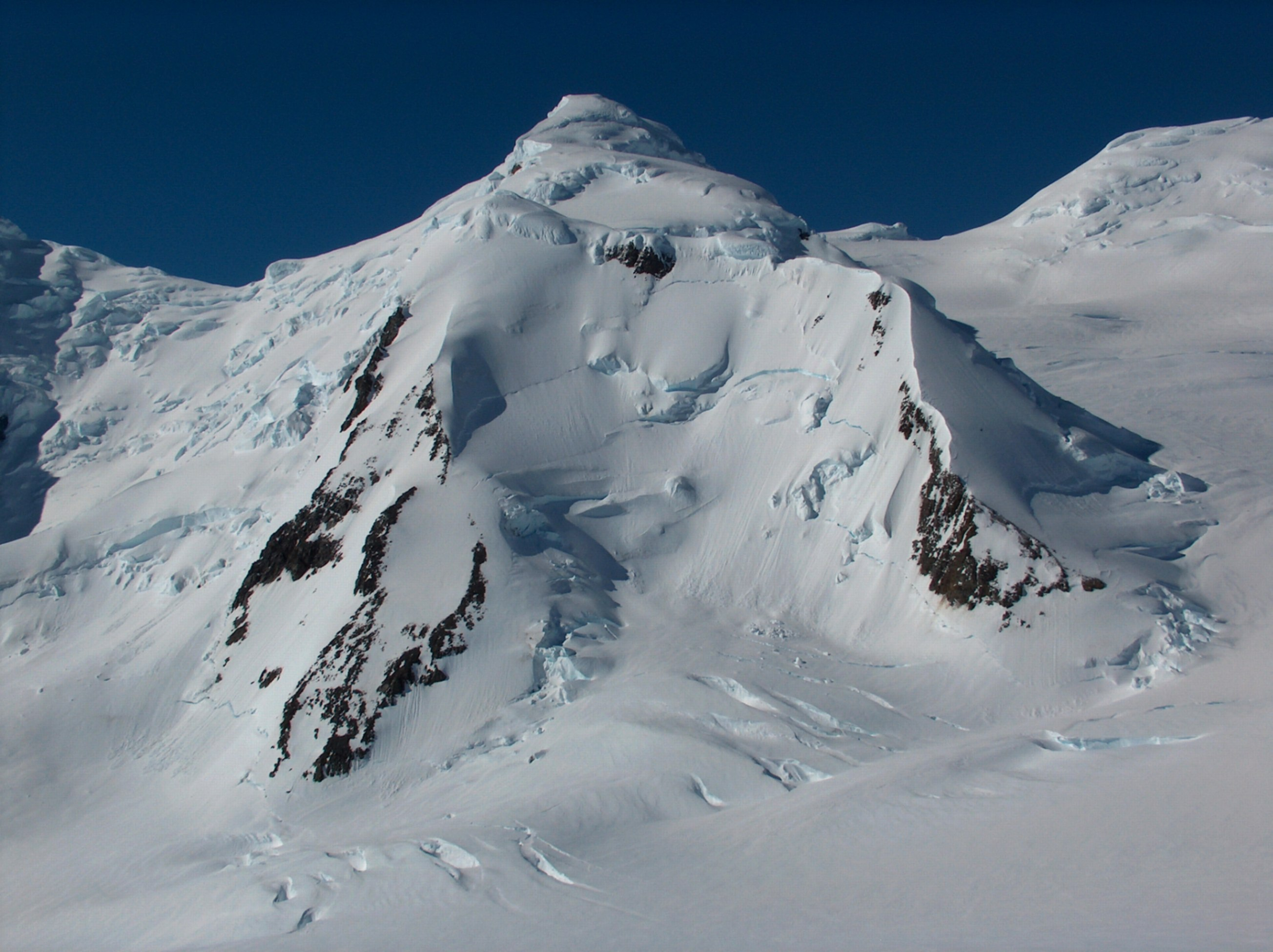
- Lyaskovets Peak from Kuzman Knoll, with Shipka Saddle to the left, Catalunyan Saddle to the right, and Zograf Peak in the foreground.

Highest point
- Elevation: 1,473 m (4,833 ft)
- Prominence: 213
- Coordinates: 62°39′48.5″S 60°08′34.7″W

Geography
- Location: Livingston Island, Antarctica
- Parent range: Tangra Mountains

Climbing
- First ascent: 14 December 2004 Lyubomir Ivanov and Doychin Vasilev
- Easiest route: snow/glacier

Location of Tangra Mountains on Livingston Island in the South Shetland Islands

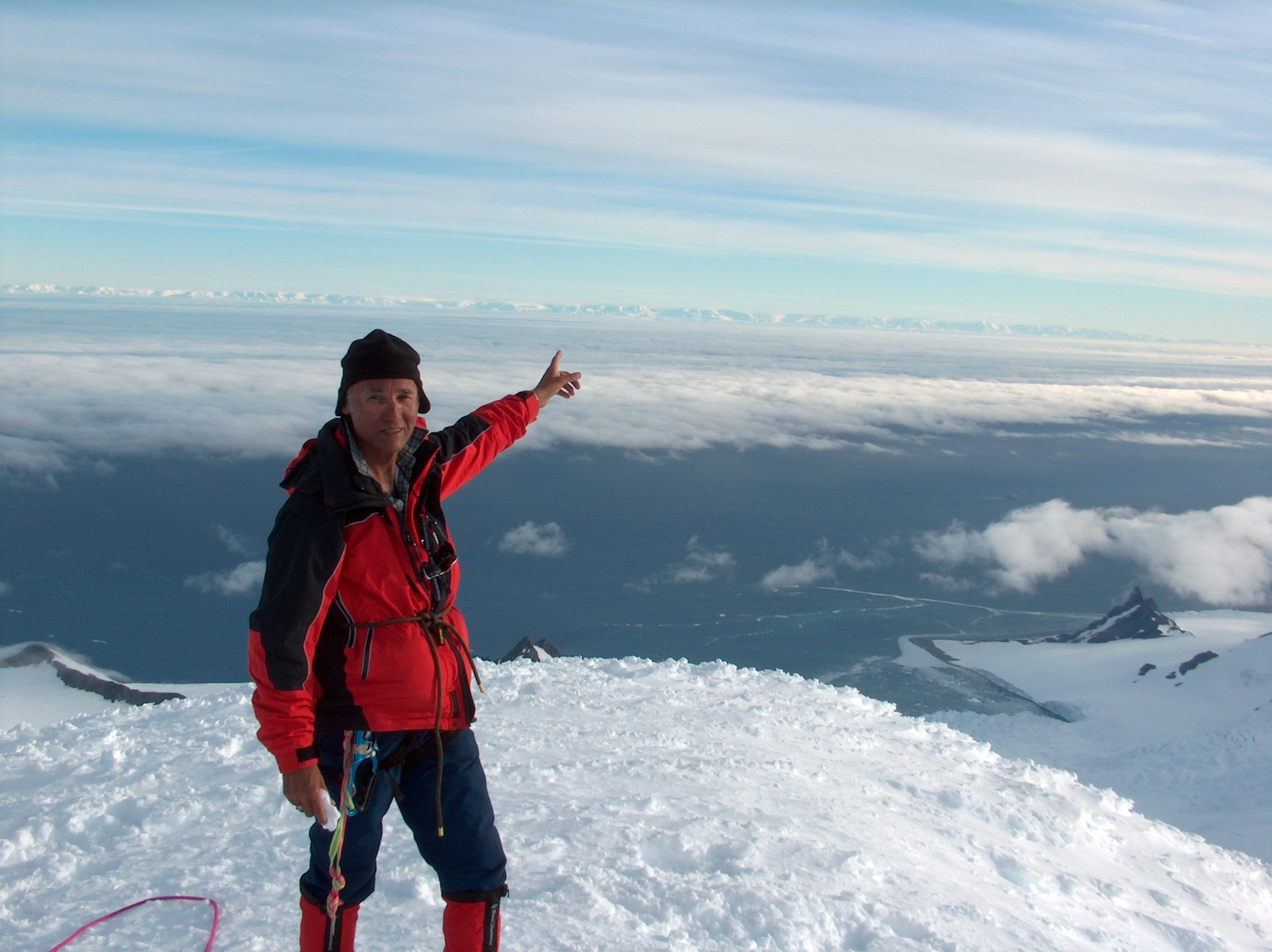
The first ascent of Lyaskovets Peak by Lyubomir Ivanov and Doychin Vasilev on 14 December 2004; south view from the summit with Bransfield Strait and Antarctic Peninsula in the background

Lyaskovets Peak (Bulgarian: връх Лясковец, romanized: vrah Lyaskovets, IPA: [ˈvrɤx ˈʎaskovɛt͡s]) is the easternmost peak of Friesland Ridge in the Tangra Mountains, eastern Livingston Island and has an elevation of 1,473 m. The peak is bounded by Catalunyan Saddle on the west and Shipka Saddle on the east, and is heavily glaciated and crevassed, with precipitous western, southern and eastern slopes. It surmounts Huron Glacier to the northwest and northeast, and Macy Glacier and Brunow Bay area to the south. Its northern offshoot forms Zograf Peak, and is linked to Lozen Nunatak, Erma Knoll and Aheloy Nunatak in Huron Glacier.

The peak is named after Lyaskovets, a town in central northern Bulgaria.

== Location ==
Lyaskovets Peak is located at 62°39′48.5″S 60°08′34.7″W, which is 2.3 km east-northeast of Mount Friesland (the summit of Friesland Ridge and Livingston Island, 1,700 m), 3.2 km south-southeast of Kuzman Knoll, 1.33 km south by east of Zograf Peak, 1.3 km west of Levski Peak, and 4.6 km west by north of Great Needle Peak (the summit of Levski Ridge, approx. 1,690 m). The feature was mapped by the UK Directorate of Overseas Surveys in 1968, and by Bulgaria in 2005 and 2009.

== History ==
The first ascent of Lyaskovets Peak was made on 14 December 2004 by Lyubomir Ivanov and Doychin Vasilev from Camp Academia (541 m) during the Tangra 2004/05 Survey. Their route (UIAA grade III) started with 4 km of solid but crevassed firn surface ascent up to Catalunyan Saddle (1,260 m) on the main crest of Tangra Mountains, from where they traversed the precipitous west slope of the peak until the north slope was reached, from where the summit – itself split by a crevasse – was easily reached.

The second ascent, also by way of Ivanov–Vasilev route, was made by the Bulgarian mountaineers Doychin Boyanov and Nikolay Petkov on 1 January 2015.

== See also ==
- Bulgarian toponyms in Antarctica

== Maps ==
- Chart of South Shetland including Coronation Island, &c. from the exploration of the sloop Dove in the years 1821 and 1822 by George Powell Commander of the same. Scale ca. 1:200000. London: Laurie, 1822
- South Shetland Islands. Scale 1:200000 topographic map. DOS 610 Sheet W 62 60. Tolworth, UK, 1968.
- Islas Livingston y Decepción. Mapa topográfico a escala 1:100000. Madrid: Servicio Geográfico del Ejército, 1991.
- L.L. Ivanov et al., Antarctica: Livingston Island, South Shetland Islands (from English Strait to Morton Strait, with illustrations and ice-cover distribution), 1:100000 scale topographic map, Antarctic Place-names Commission of Bulgaria, Sofia, 2005
- L.L. Ivanov. Antarctica: Livingston Island and Greenwich, Robert, Snow and Smith Islands. Scale 1:120000 topographic map. Troyan: Manfred Wörner Foundation, 2010. ISBN 978-954-92032-9-5 (First edition 2009. ISBN 978-954-92032-6-4)
- Antarctic Digital Database (ADD). Scale 1:250000 topographic map of Antarctica. Scientific Committee on Antarctic Research (SCAR), 1993–2016.
- L.L. Ivanov. Antarctica: Livingston Island and Smith Island. Scale 1:100000 topographic map. Manfred Wörner Foundation, 2017. ISBN 978-619-90008-3-0
- A. Kamburov and L. Ivanov. Bowles Ridge and Central Tangra Mountains: Livingston Island, Antarctica. Scale 1:25000 map. Sofia: Manfred Wörner Foundation, 2023. ISBN 978-619-90008-6-1

== Gallery ==
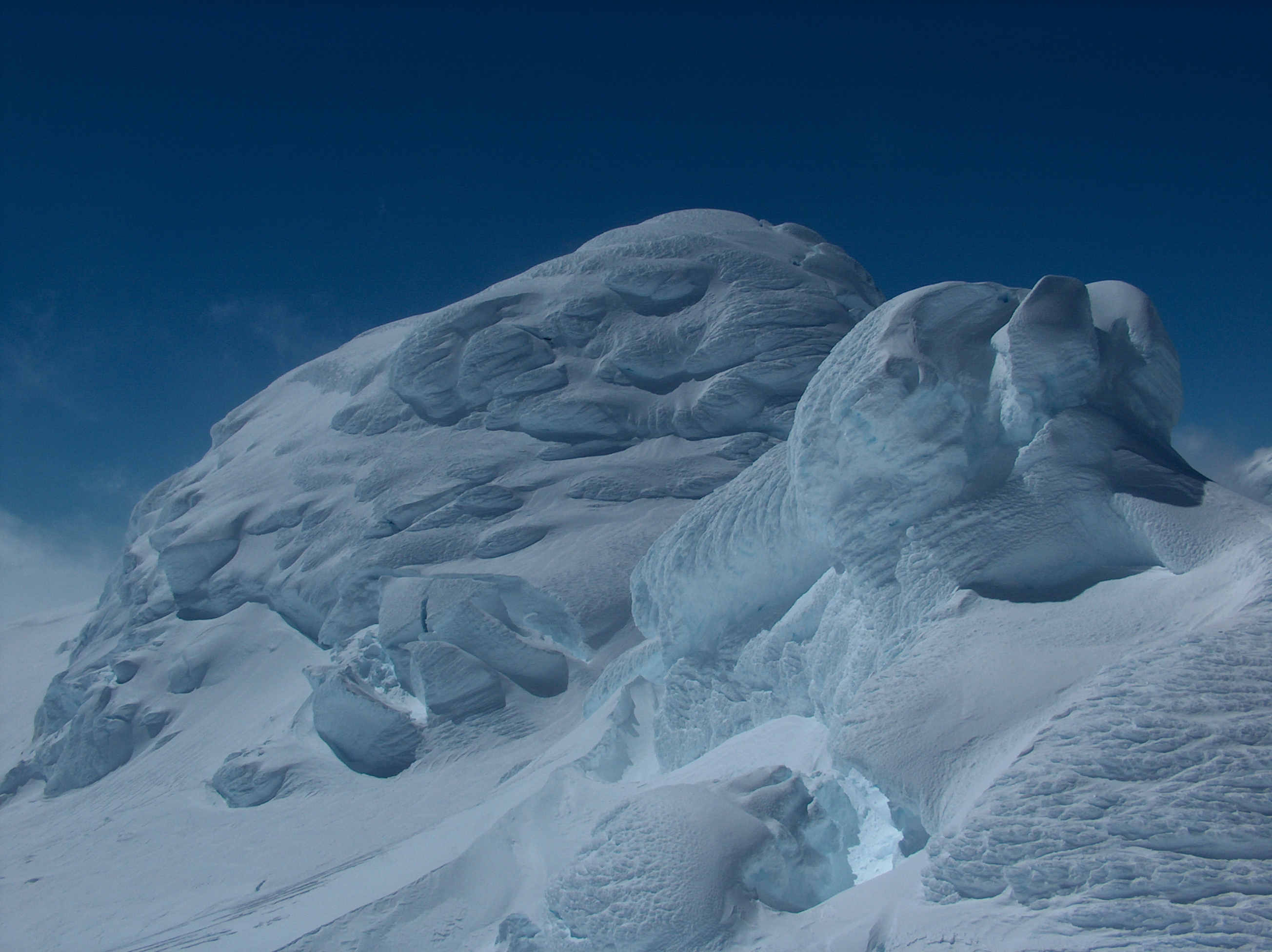
Lyaskovets Peak from the west extremity of Catalunyan Saddle with 'the Sphynx' rock-cored ice formation in the foreground

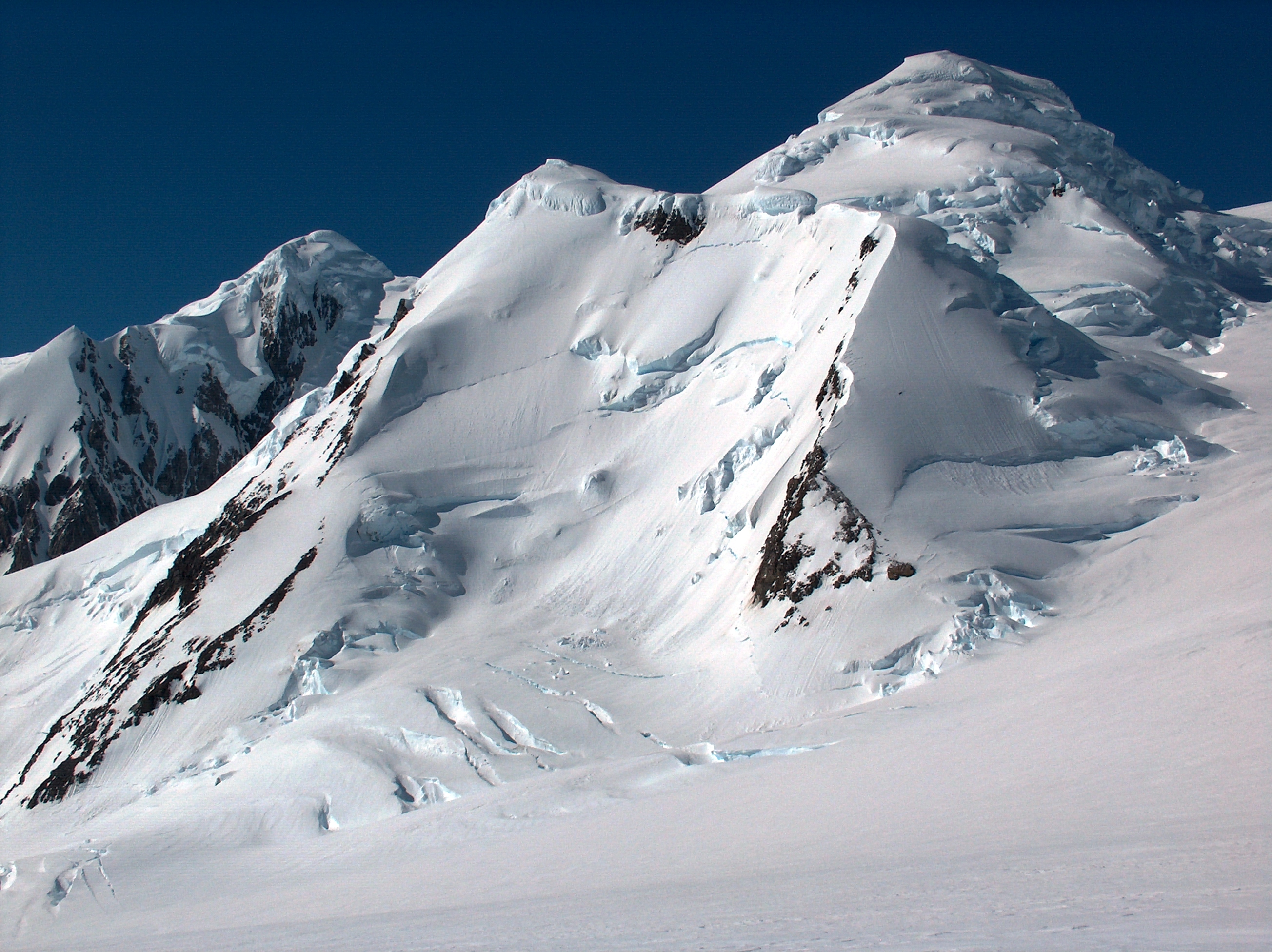
Lyaskovets Peak with Levski Peak on the left and Zograf Peak in the foreground

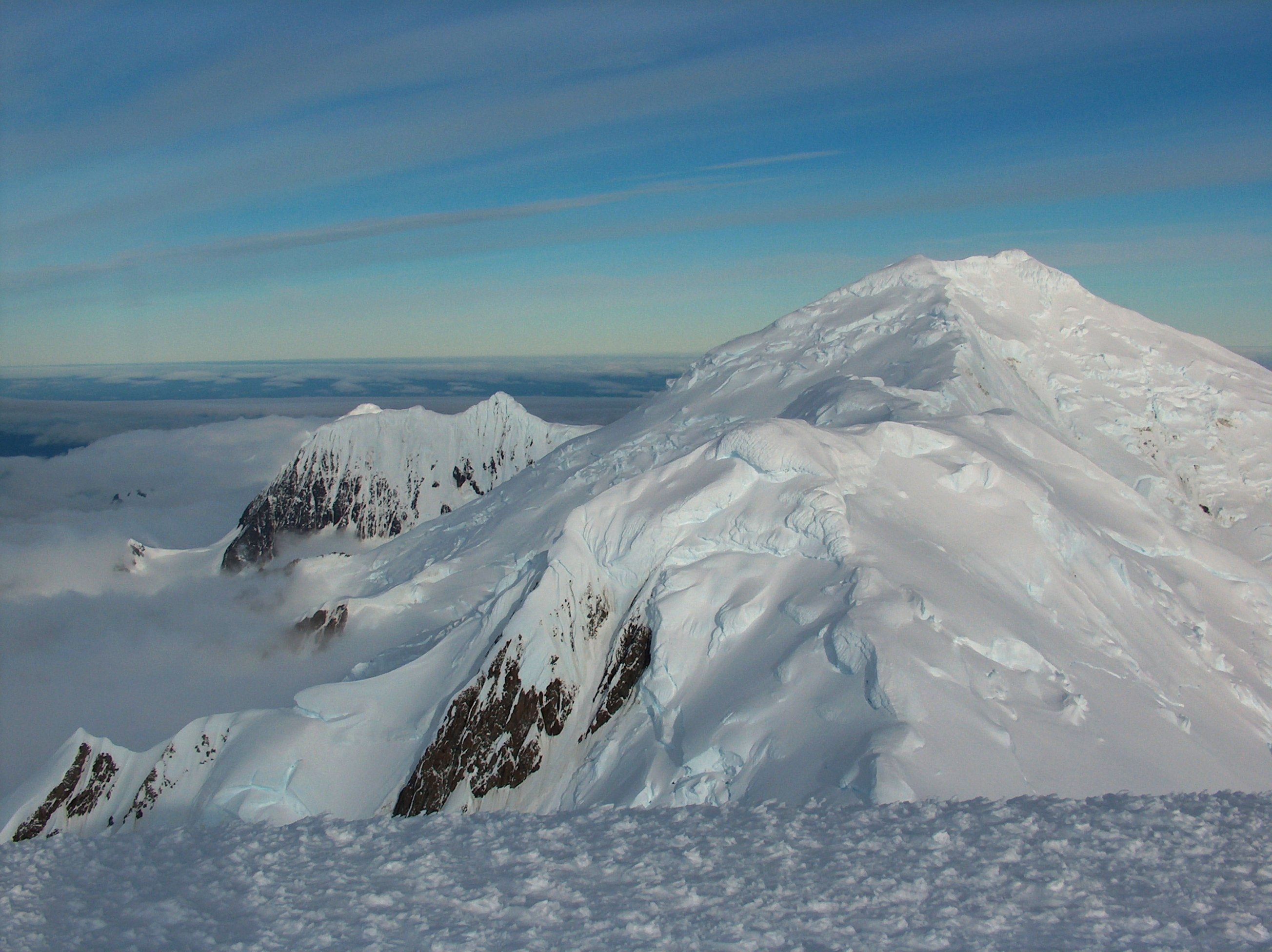
On Lyaskovets Peak, looking east towards Levski Ridge

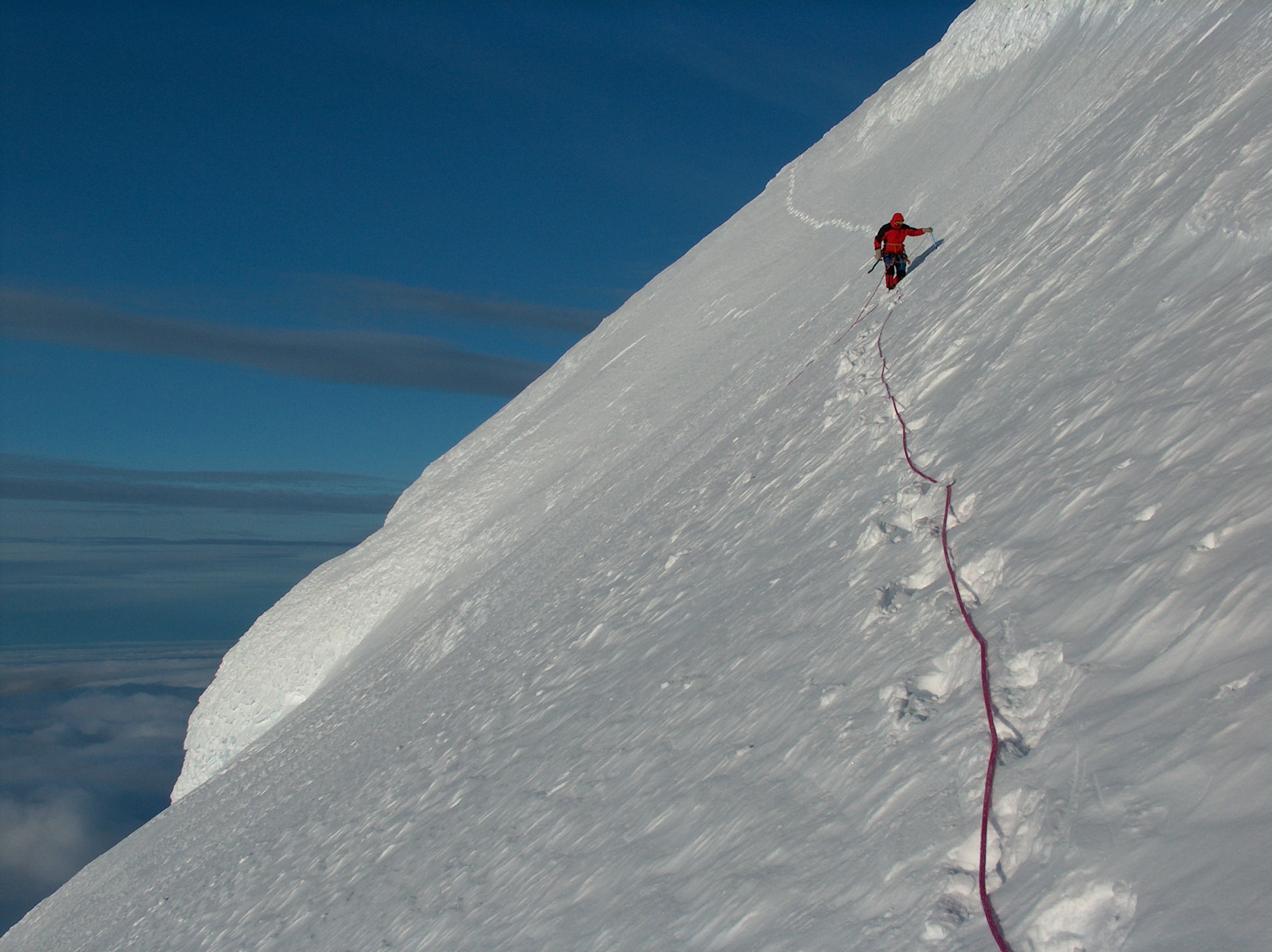
Traversing the west slope of Lyaskovets Peak back to Catalunyan Saddle during the first ascent of the peak

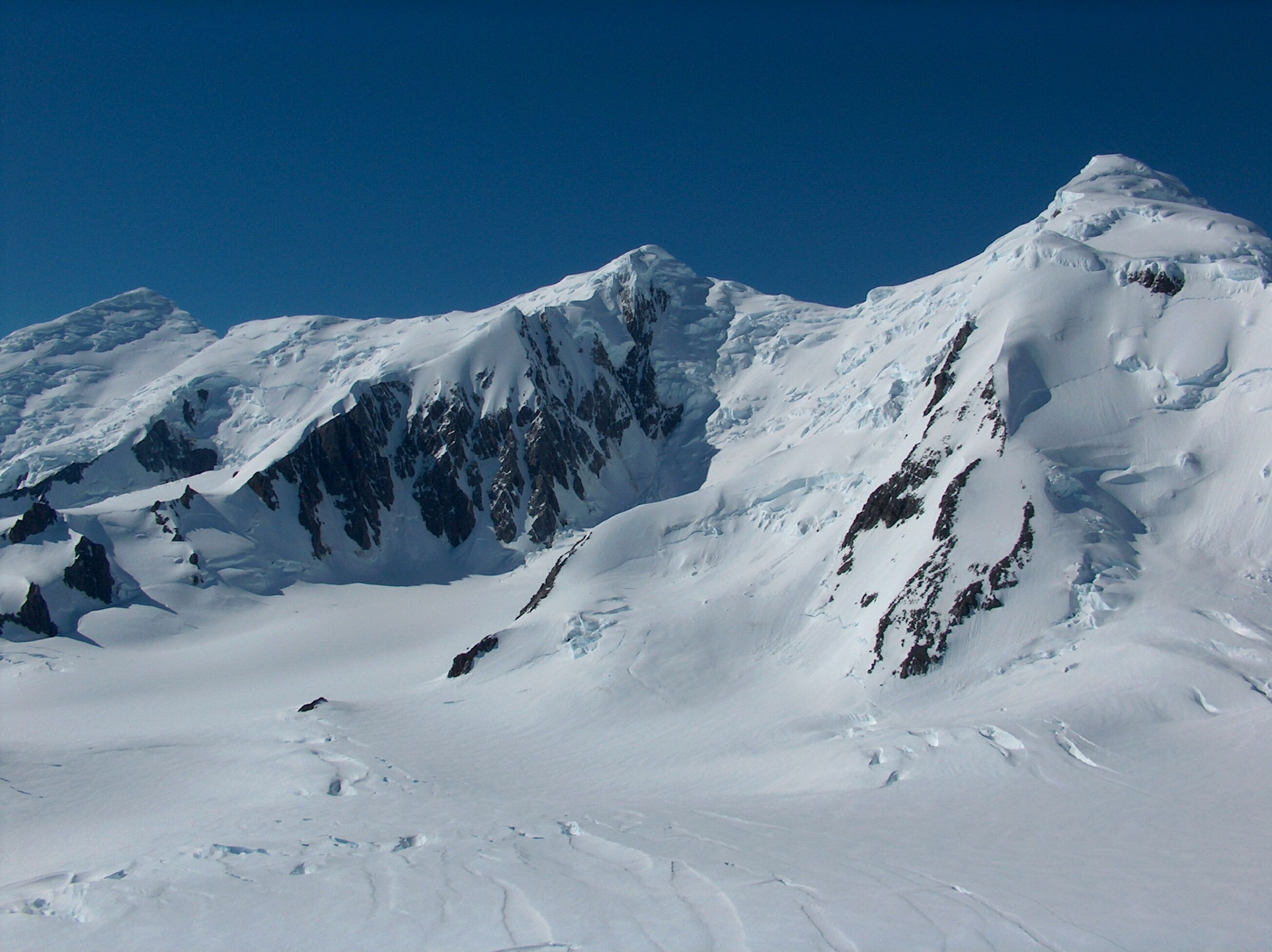
Central Tangra Mountains, left to right Great Needle Peak, Levski Peak and Lyaskovets Peak

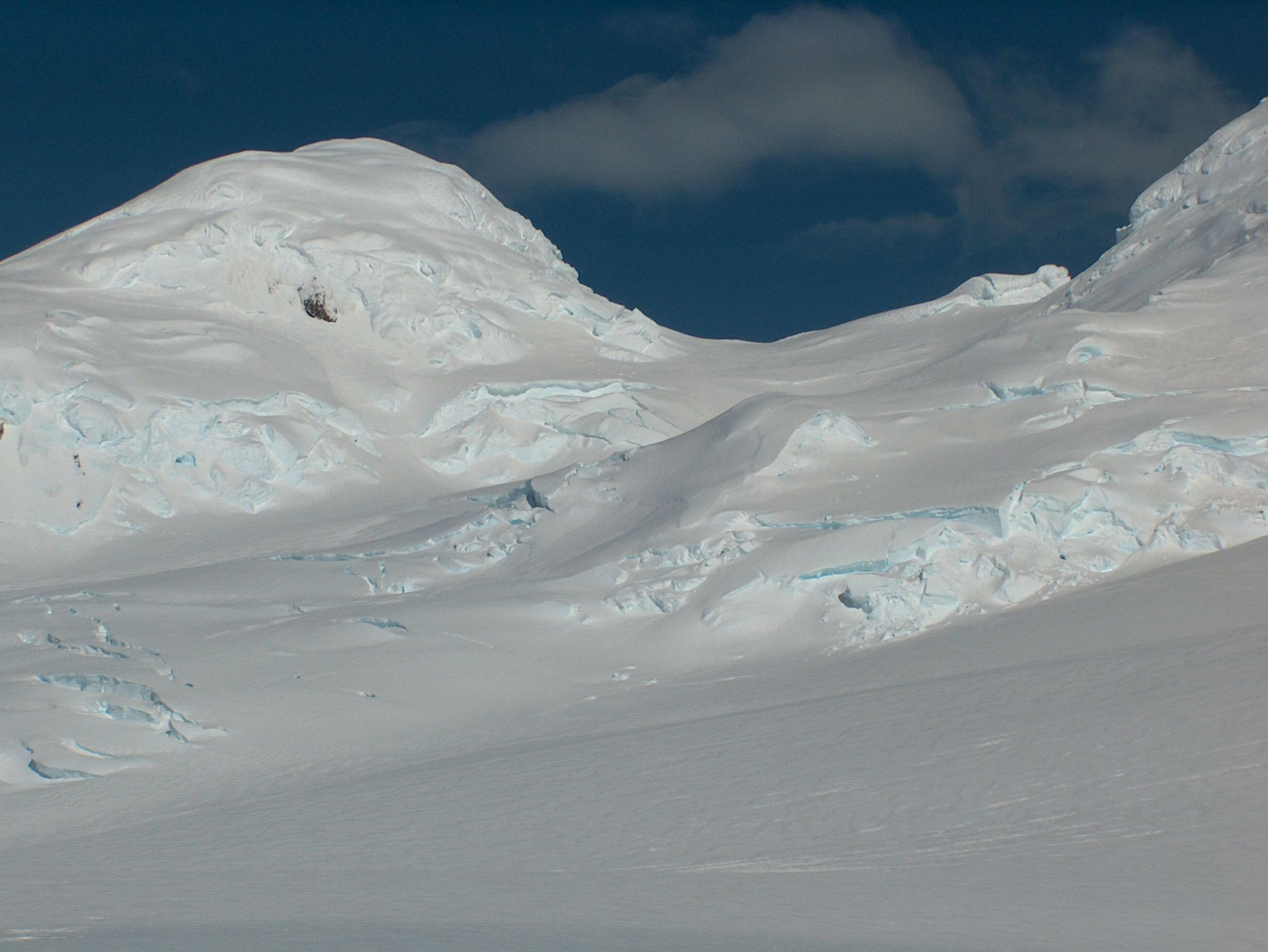
Lyaskovets Peak from Wörner Gap, with Catalunyan Saddle on the right

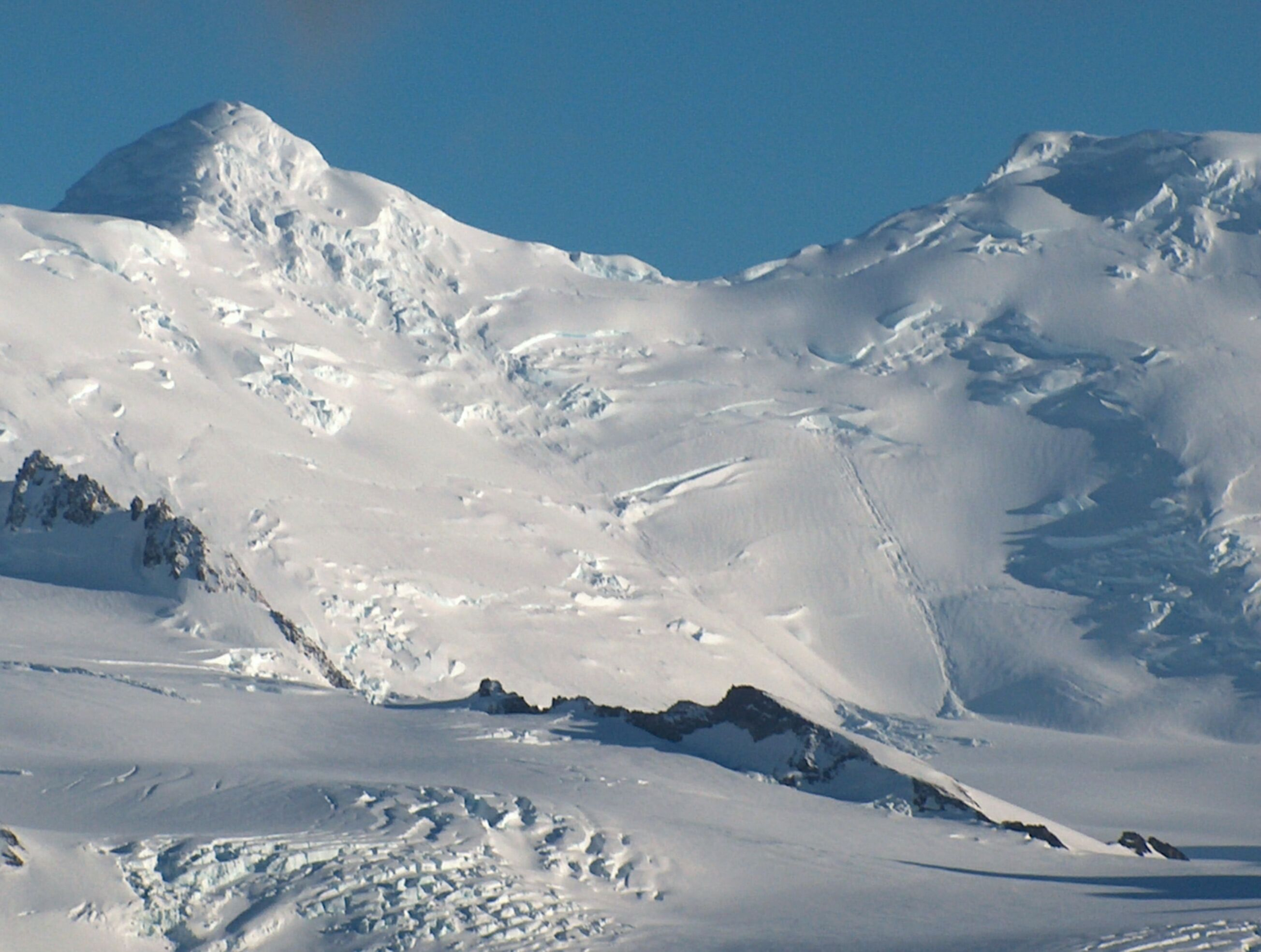
Lyaskovets Peak from Bransfield Strait, with Shipka Saddle and Levski Peak on the right

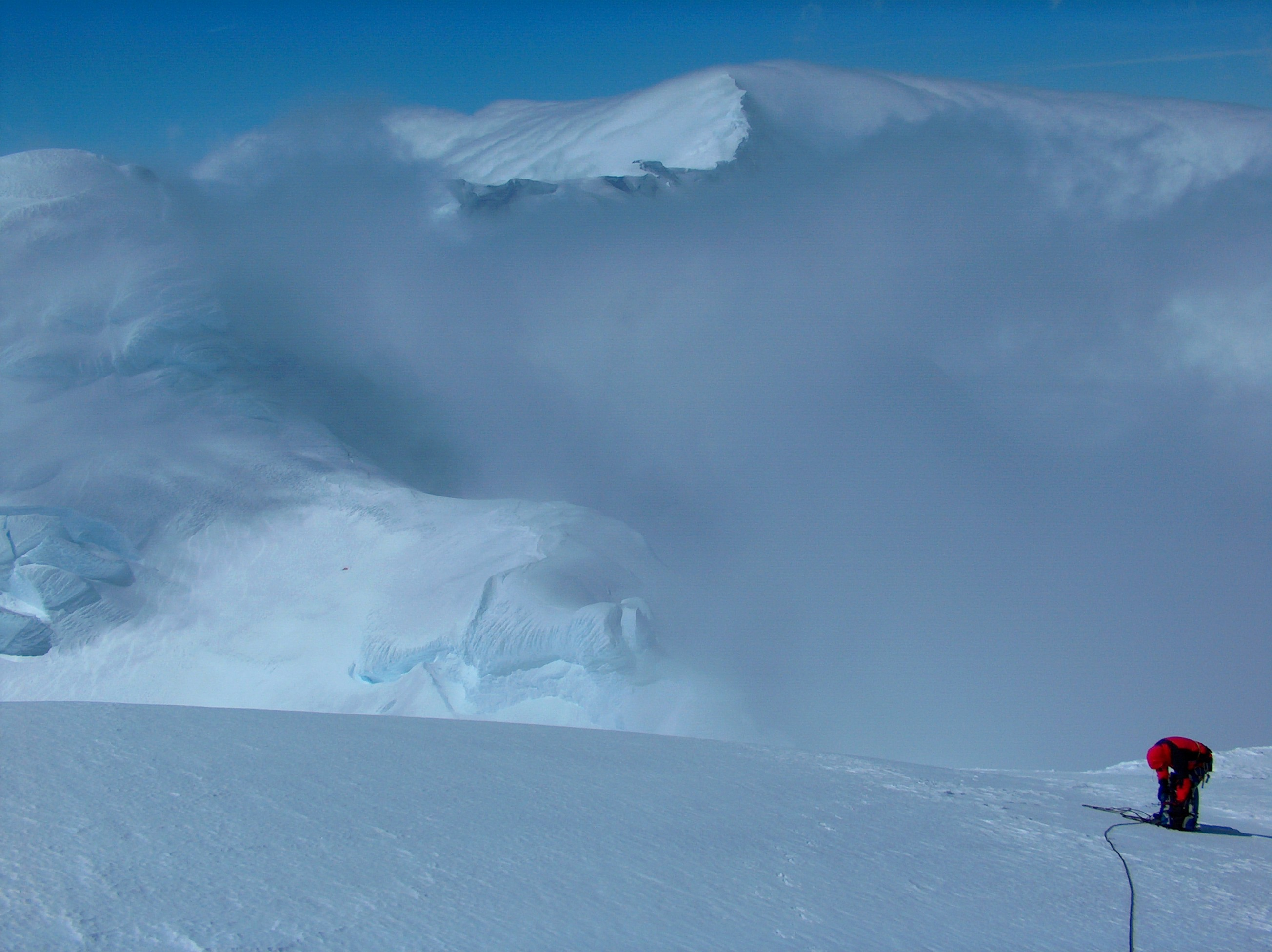
On the crest of Tangra Mountains, a view from Presian Ridge east towards Catalunyan Saddle (with the bivouac of Tangra 2004/05 Survey), Lyaskovets Peak is on the left, and St. Ivan Rilski Col and Great Needle Peak in the background

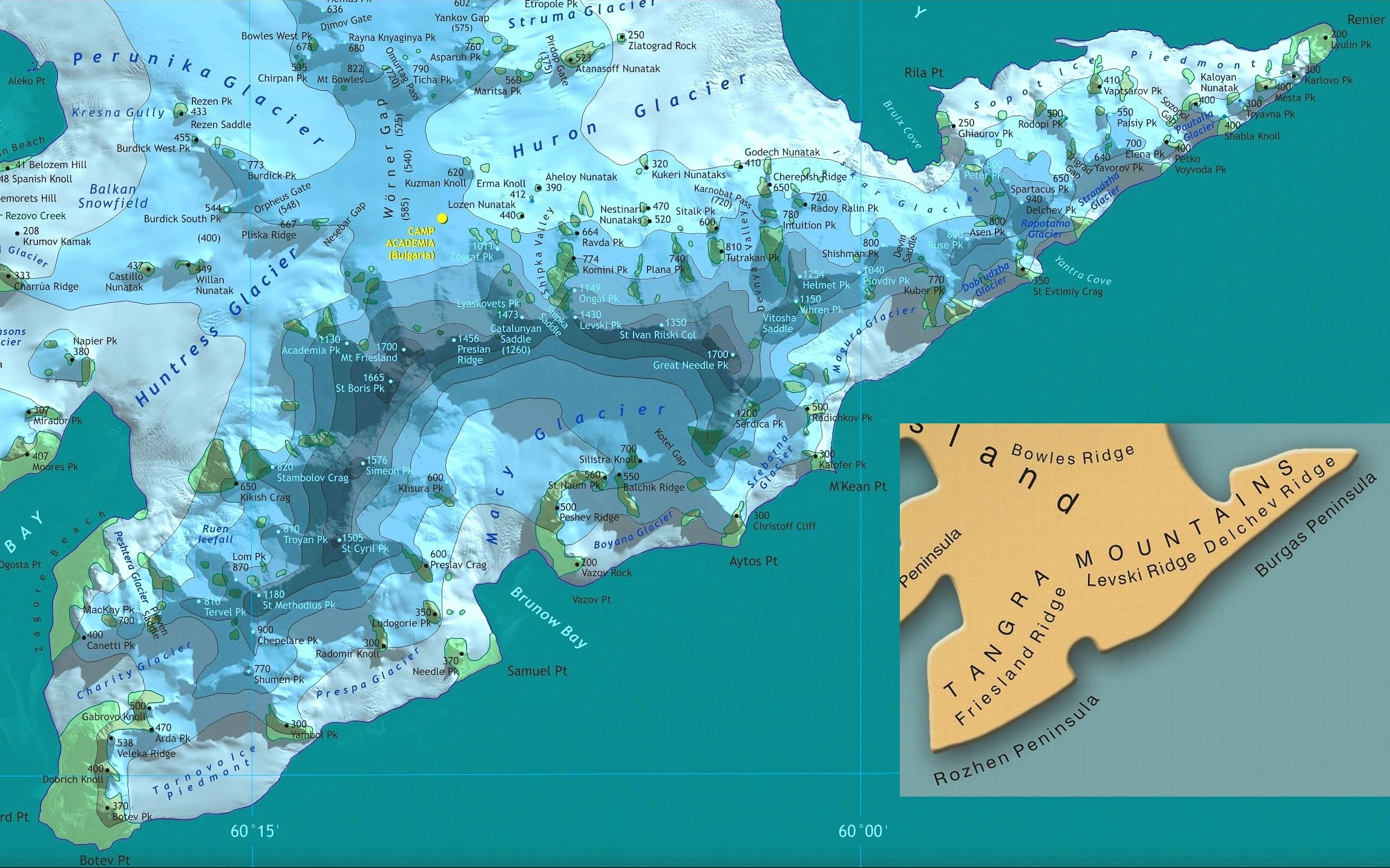
Map of Tangra Mountains

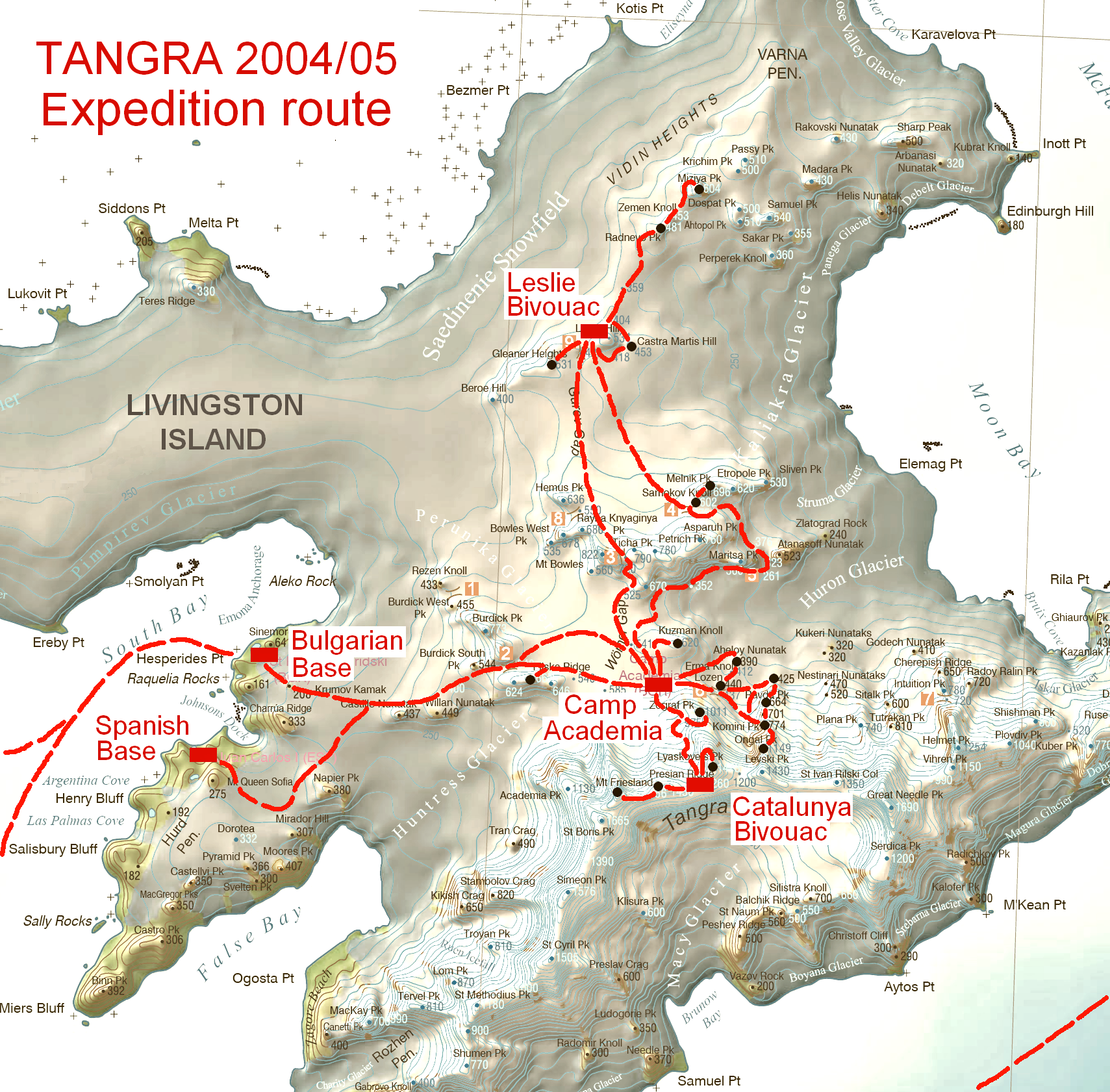
Tangra 2004/05 Survey route

Topographic map of Livingston Island and Smith Island

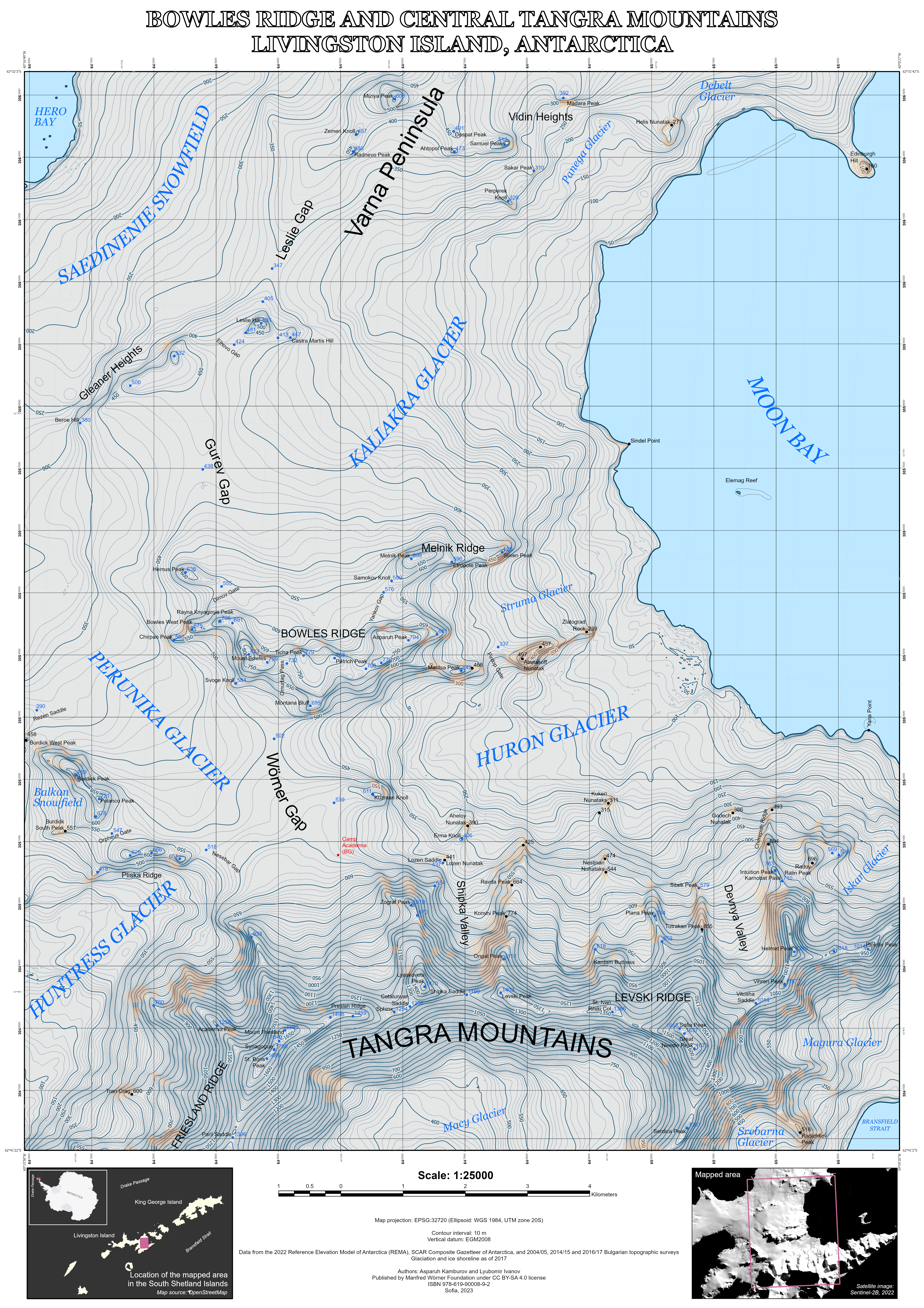
Topographic map of Bowles Ridge and Central Tangra Mountains

== Notes ==
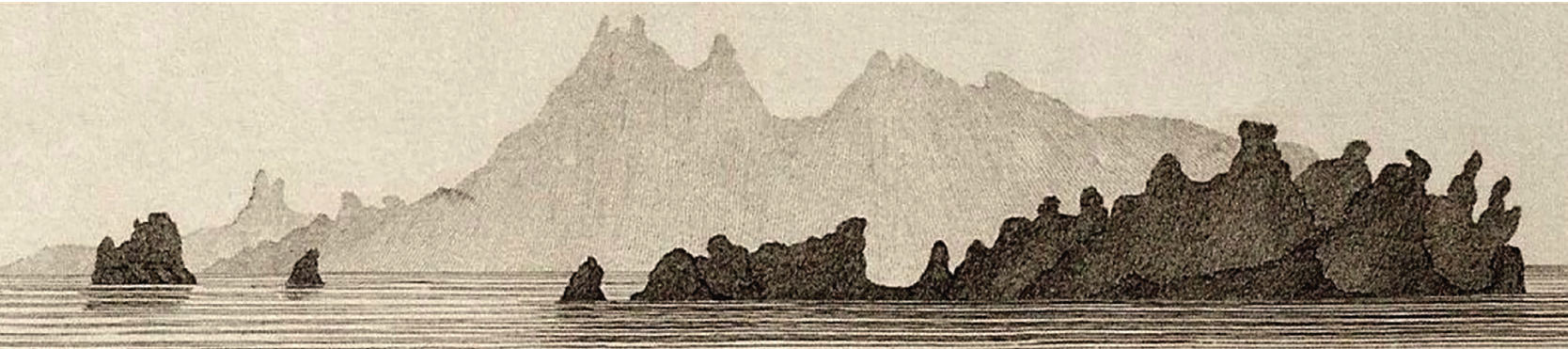
North view of Tangra Mountains depicting (left to right) Great Needle Peak, Levski Peak, Lyaskovets Peak, Mount Friesland, St. Boris Peak and Simeon Peak, with Desolation Island in the foreground; fragment of an illustration to George Powell's 1822 chart of the South Shetland and South Orkney Islands
