= Kardam Buttress =

Location of Tangra Mountains on Livingston Island in the South Shetland Islands.

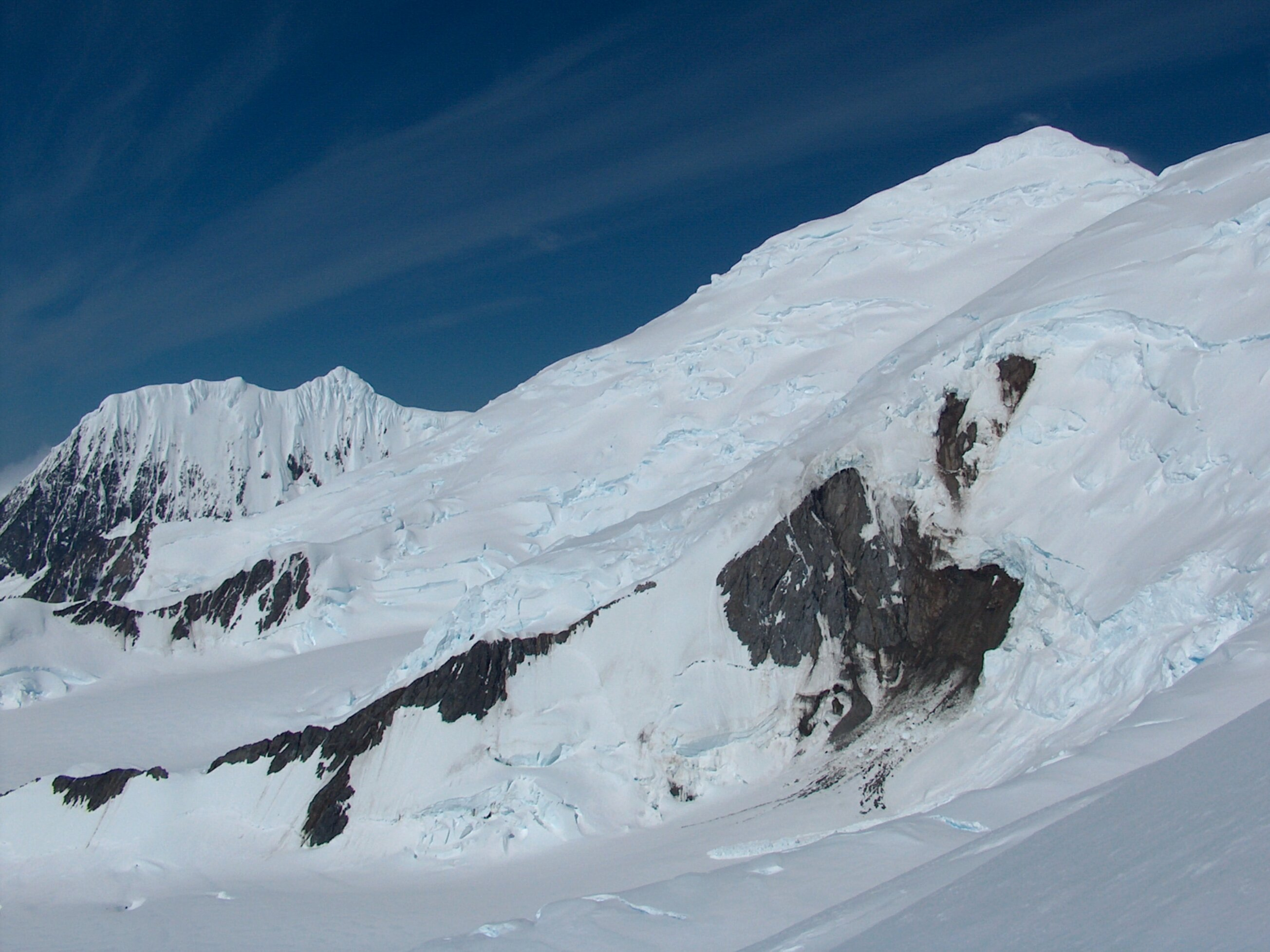
Kardam Buttress from Ongal Peak.

Topographic map of Livingston Island and Smith Island.

Kardam Buttress (Kardamov Rid \kar-'da-mov 'rid\) is a sloping buttress projecting 1 km northwards from St. Ivan Rilski Col into Huron Glacier on Livingston Island in the South Shetland Islands, Antarctica, and has precipitous and partly ice-free western slopes. Surmounting Huron Glacier to the north. It is named after the Bulgarian ruler Khan Kardam.

== Location ==
The buttress is located at 62°39′28″S 60°05′27″W which is 1.3 km east of Komini Peak, 1 km west of Plana Peak, and 700 m south of Nestinari Nunataks (Bulgarian topographic survey Tangra 2004/05 and mapping in 2009).

== Maps ==
- L.L. Ivanov. Antarctica: Livingston Island and Greenwich, Robert, Snow and Smith Islands. Scale 1:120000 topographic map. Troyan: Manfred Wörner Foundation, 2009.
- A. Kamburov and L. Ivanov. Bowles Ridge and Central Tangra Mountains: Livingston Island, Antarctica. Scale 1:25000 map. Sofia: Manfred Wörner Foundation, 2023. ISBN 978-619-90008-6-1
