= St. Ivan Rilski Col =

Feature in the South Shetland Islands, Antarctica

Location of Tangra Mountains on Livingston Island in the South Shetland Islands

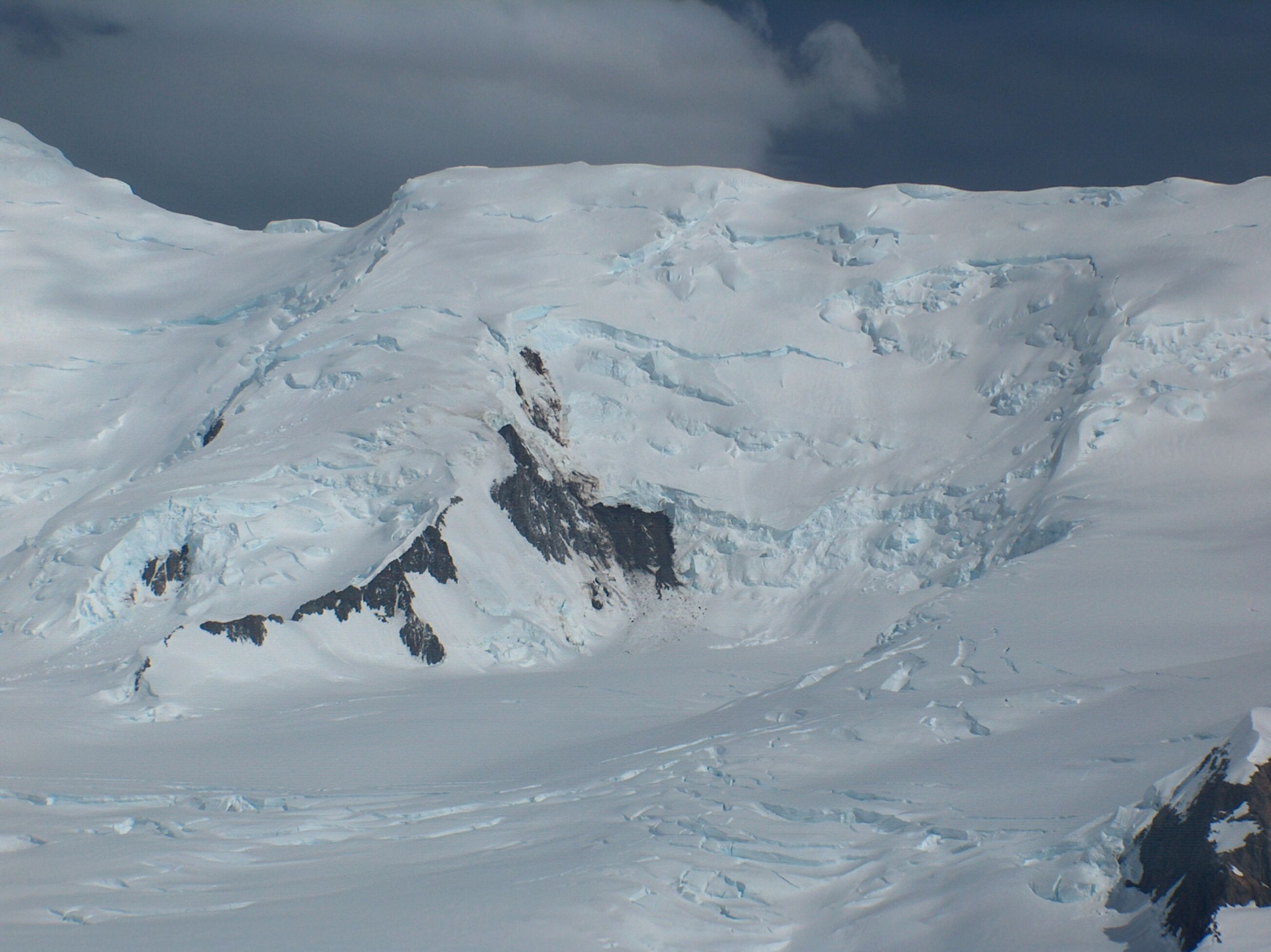
St. Ivan Rilski Col from Pirdop Gate

Topographic map of Livingston Island and Smith Island.

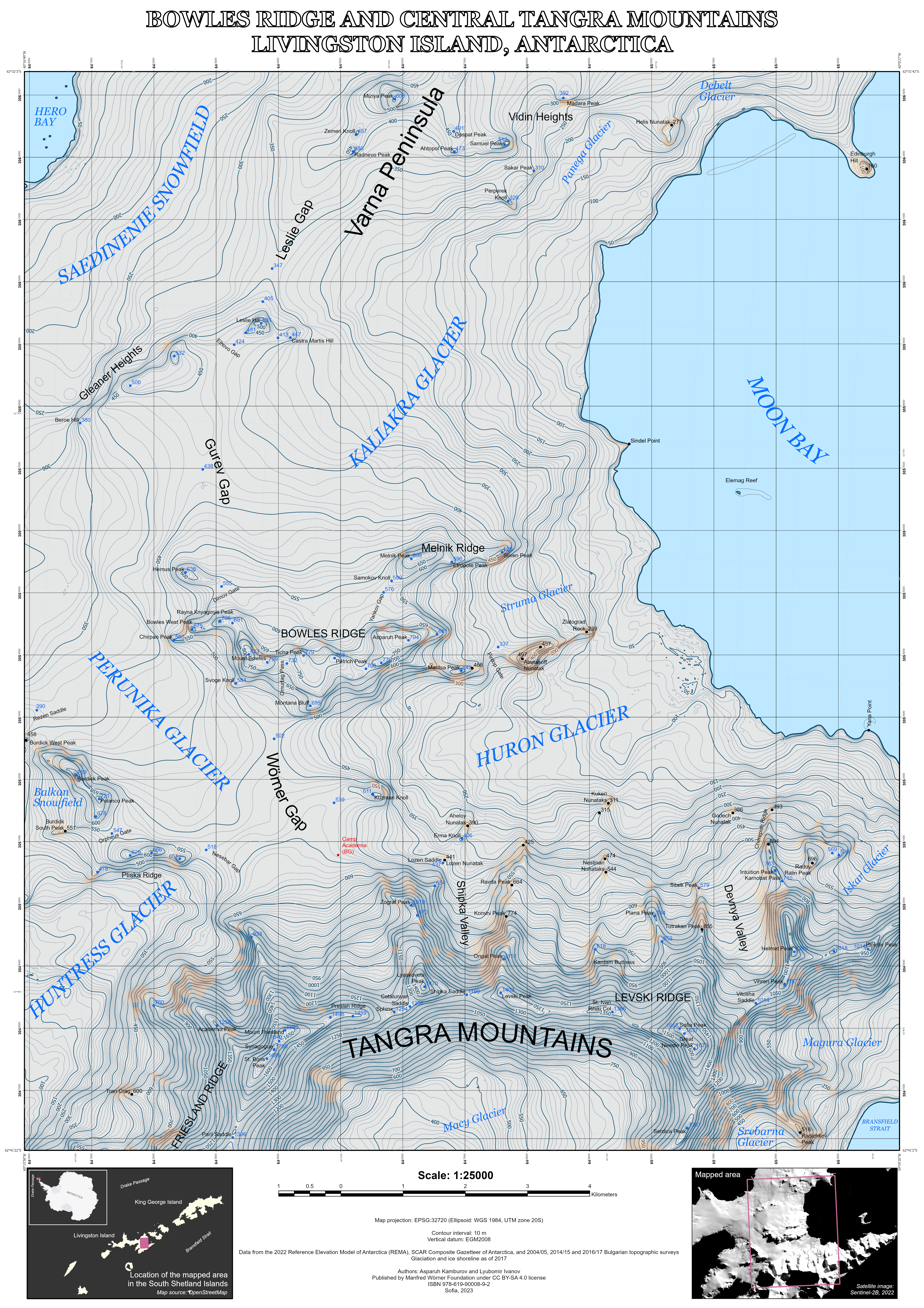
Topographic map of Bowles Ridge and central Tangra Mountains featuring St. Ivan Rilski Col

St. Ivan Rilski Col (Rid Sv. Ivan Rilski \'rid sve-'ti i-'van 'ril-ski\) is an ice-covered col linking the Great Needle Peak (Falsa Aguja Peak) and Levski Peak in Levski Ridge, Tangra Mountains, eastern Livingston Island in the South Shetland Islands, Antarctica.

The feature is 1.4 km long, its axis trending east-west, with precipitous southern slopes. It has a slightly higher eastern portion of elevation 1,386 m from which Kardam Buttress is projecting northwards. It is part of the divide between the glacial catchments of Huron Glacier to the north and the head of Macy Glacier to the south.

The col is named after Sveti Ivan Rilski (St. John of Rila) (876-946 AD), a Bulgarian hermit who founded the Rila Monastery.

== Location ==
The highest point of the col is located at 62°39′54″S 60°05′05″W, which is 1.65 km west-northwest of Great Needle Peak, 2.86 km north of Silistra Knoll, 1.69 km east of Levski Peak and 2.2 km south of Nestinari Nunataks (Bulgarian mapping in 2005 and 2009).

== Maps ==
- L.L. Ivanov et al. Antarctica: Livingston Island and Greenwich Island, South Shetland Islands. Scale 1:100000 topographic map. Sofia: Antarctic Place-names Commission of Bulgaria, 2005.
- L.L. Ivanov. Antarctica: Livingston Island and Greenwich, Robert, Snow and Smith Islands. Scale 1:120000 topographic map. Troyan: Manfred Wörner Foundation, 2009.
- A. Kamburov and L. Ivanov. Bowles Ridge and Central Tangra Mountains: Livingston Island, Antarctica. Scale 1:25000 map. Sofia: Manfred Wörner Foundation, 2023. ISBN 978-619-90008-6-1
