= Plana Peak =

On Livingston Island in the South Shetland Islands, Antarctica

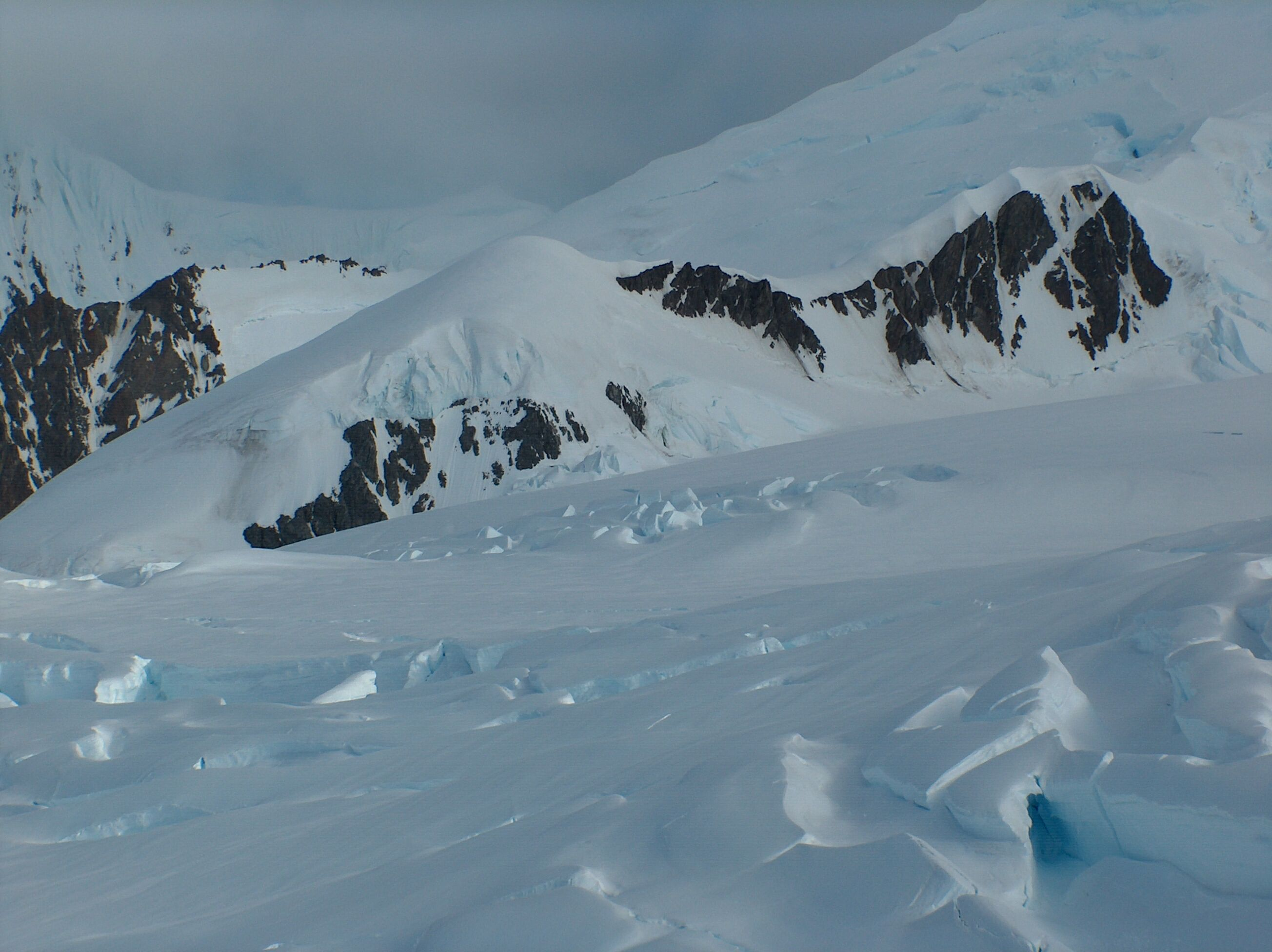
- Plana Peak from near Ravda Peak

Highest point
- Elevation: 740 m (2,430 ft)
- Coordinates: 62°39′06″S 60°04′20″W

Geography
- Location: Livingston Island, Antarctica
- Parent range: Tangra Mountains

Climbing
- Easiest route: snow/glacier

Location of Tangra Mountains on Livingston Island in the South Shetland Islands.

Topographic map of Livingston Island, Greenwich, Robert, Snow and Smith Islands.

Plana Peak (Bulgarian: връх Плана, romanized: vrah Plana, IPA: [ˈvrɤx ˈpɫanɐ]) is a mostly ice-covered peak on the Levski Ridge, Tangra Mountains, Livingston Island in the South Shetland Islands, Antarctica. Surmounting Huron Glacier to the north and its tributaries to the east and west. First ascent by D. Boyanov, N. Petkov and A. Shopov on 8 January 2015. The peak is named after Plana Mountain in Western Bulgaria.

== Location ==
The peak is located 2.21 km north-northwest of Great Needle Peak (Falsa Aguja Peak), 2.66 km northeast of Levski Peak and 2.45 km west-northwest of Helmet Peak (Bulgarian topographic survey Tangra 2004/05, and mapping in 2005 and 2009).

== Maps ==
- L.L. Ivanov et al. Antarctica: Livingston Island and Greenwich Island, South Shetland Islands. Scale 1:100000 topographic map. Sofia: Antarctic Place-names Commission of Bulgaria, 2005.
- L.L. Ivanov. Antarctica: Livingston Island and Greenwich, Robert, Snow and Smith Islands. Scale 1:120000 topographic map. Troyan: Manfred Wörner Foundation, 2009. ISBN 978-954-92032-6-4
- A. Kamburov and L. Ivanov. Bowles Ridge and Central Tangra Mountains: Livingston Island, Antarctica. Scale 1:25000 map. Sofia: Manfred Wörner Foundation, 2023. ISBN 978-619-90008-6-1
