= Levski Peak (Antarctica) =

Mountain in Livingston Island, South Shetland Islands, Antarctica

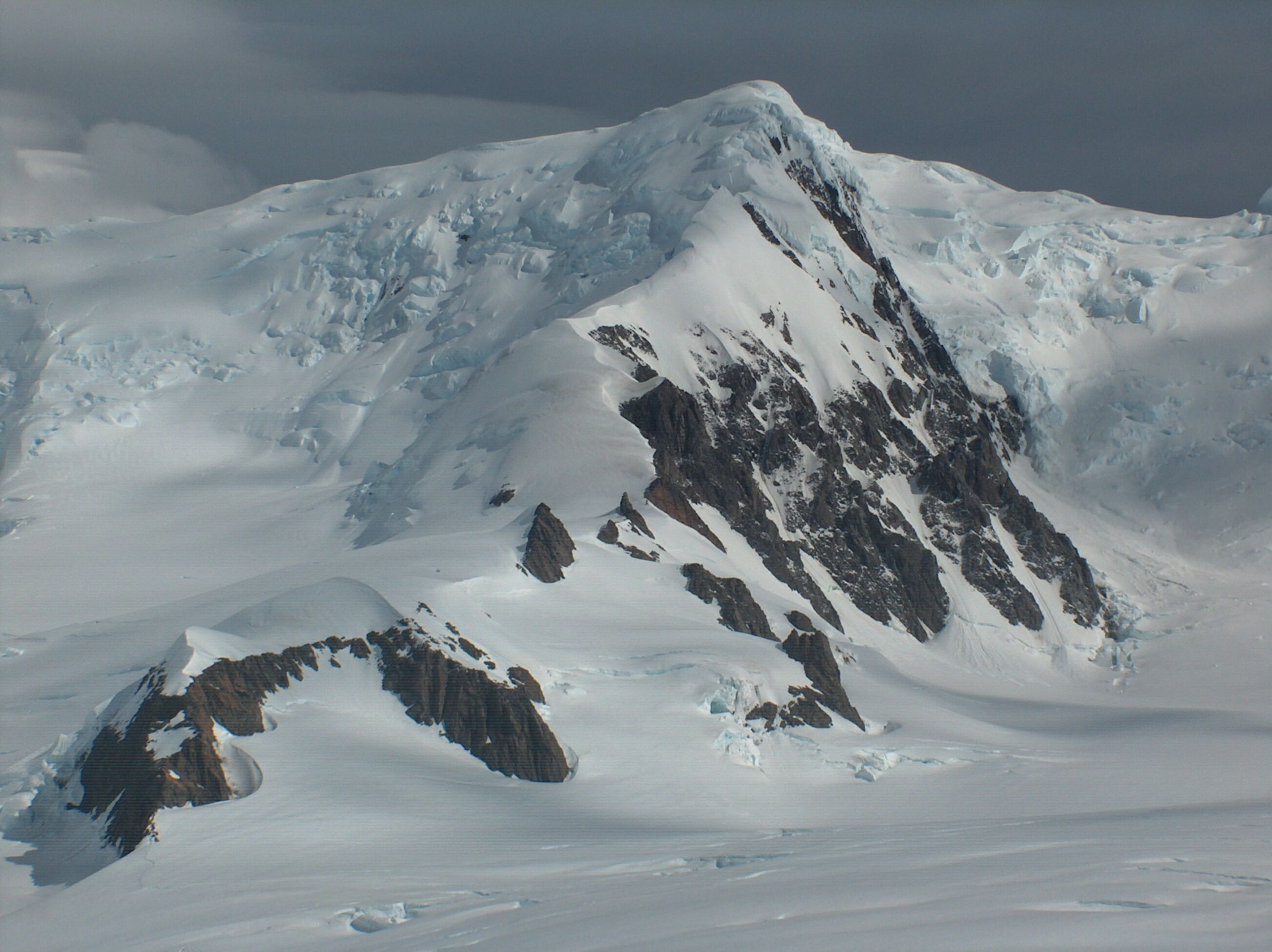
- Levski Peak from Pirdop Gate

Highest point
- Elevation: 1,430 m (4,690 ft)
- Coordinates: 62°39′47.7″S 60°07′03″W

Geography
- Location: Livingston Island, Antarctica
- Parent range: Tangra Mountains

Climbing
- First ascent: unclimbed

Location of Tangra Mountains on Livingston Island in the South Shetland Islands.

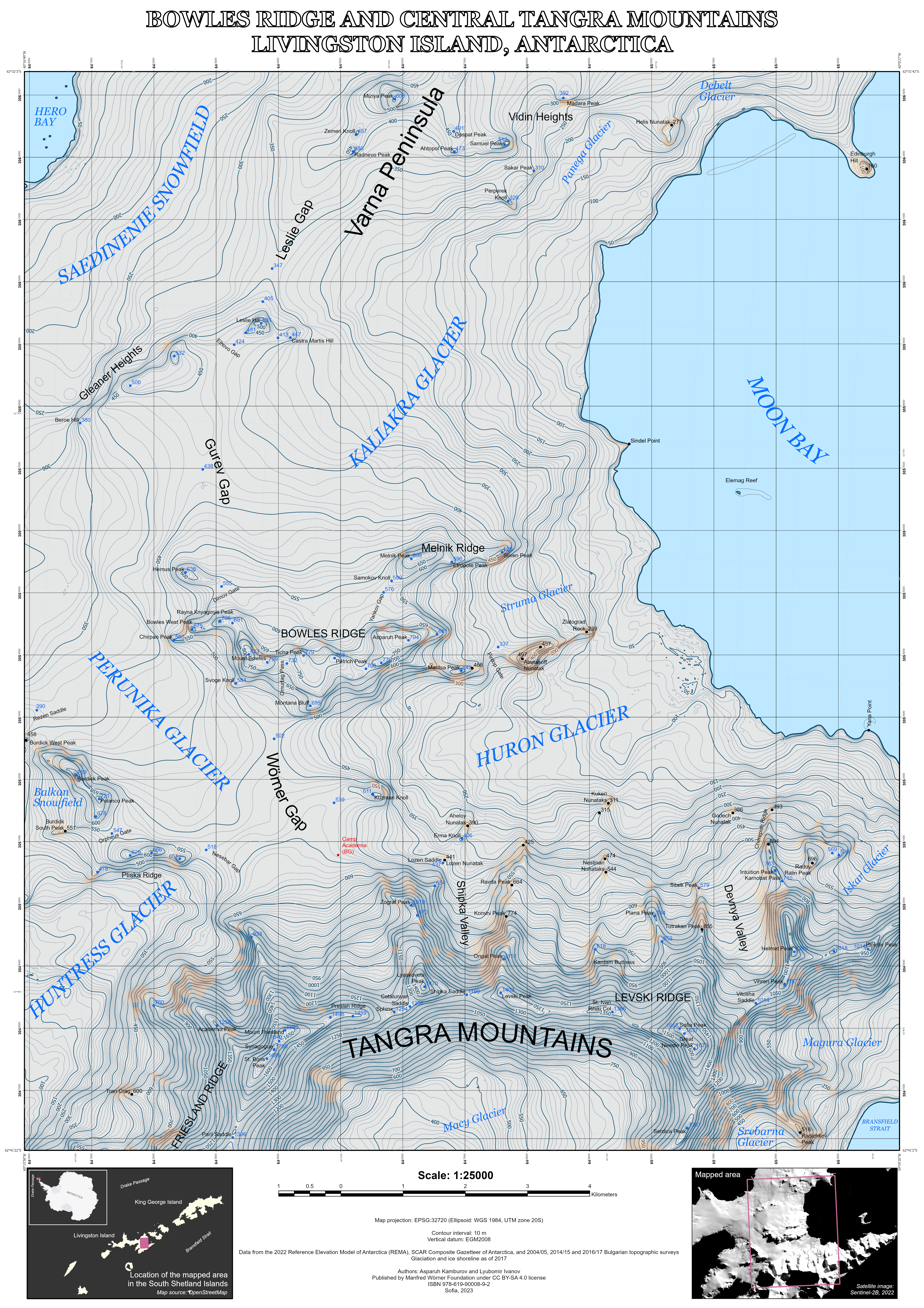
Topographic map of Bowles Ridge and central Tangra Mountains featuring Levski Peak

Levski Peak (Bulgarian: връх Левски, romanized: vrah Levski, IPA: [ˈvrɤx ˈɫɛfski]) is a mountain in Antarctica, rising to approximately 1,430 m (4,692 ft) in the western extremity of Levski Ridge, Tangra Mountains on Livingston Island in the South Shetland Islands, Antarctica. It surmounts Huron Glacier to the north and Macy Glacier to the south. The peak was named after Vasil Levski (1837–1873), a national hero of the Bulgarian liberation movement.

== Location ==
The peak is located to the east of Shipka Saddle, 1.3 km (0.81 mi) east of Lyaskovets Peak, 3.78 km (2.35 mi) southeast of Kuzman Knoll, 5.37 km (3.34 mi) south of Atanasoff Nunatak, 3.32 km (2.06 mi) west by north of Great Needle Peak (Falsa Aguja), and 3.46 km (2.15 mi) km north by west of St. Naum Peak.

== Maps ==
- Chart of South Shetland including Coronation Island, &c. from the exploration of the sloop Dove in the years 1821 and 1822 by George Powell Commander of the same. Scale ca. 1:200000. London: Laurie, 1822
- South Shetland Islands. Scale 1:200000 topographic map. DOS 610 Sheet W 62 60. Tolworth, UK, 1968.
- Islas Livingston y Decepción. Mapa topográfico a escala 1:100000. Madrid: Servicio Geográfico del Ejército, 1991.
- S. Soccol, D. Gildea and J. Bath. Livingston Island, Antarctica. Scale 1:100000 satellite map. The Omega Foundation, USA, 2004.
- L.L. Ivanov et al., Antarctica: Livingston Island and Greenwich Island, South Shetland Islands (from English Strait to Morton Strait, with illustrations and ice-cover distribution), 1:100000 scale topographic map, Antarctic Place-names Commission of Bulgaria, Sofia, 2005.
- L.L. Ivanov. Antarctica: Livingston Island and Greenwich, Robert, Snow and Smith Islands. Scale 1:120000 topographic map. Troyan: Manfred Wörner Foundation, 2010. ISBN 978-954-92032-9-5 (First edition 2009. ISBN 978-954-92032-6-4)
- Antarctic Digital Database (ADD). Scale 1:250000 topographic map of Antarctica. Scientific Committee on Antarctic Research (SCAR), 1993–2016.
- A. Kamburov and L. Ivanov. Bowles Ridge and Central Tangra Mountains: Livingston Island, Antarctica. Scale 1:25000 map. Sofia: Manfred Wörner Foundation, 2023. ISBN 978-619-90008-6-1
