= Ongal Peak =

Peak in Antarctica

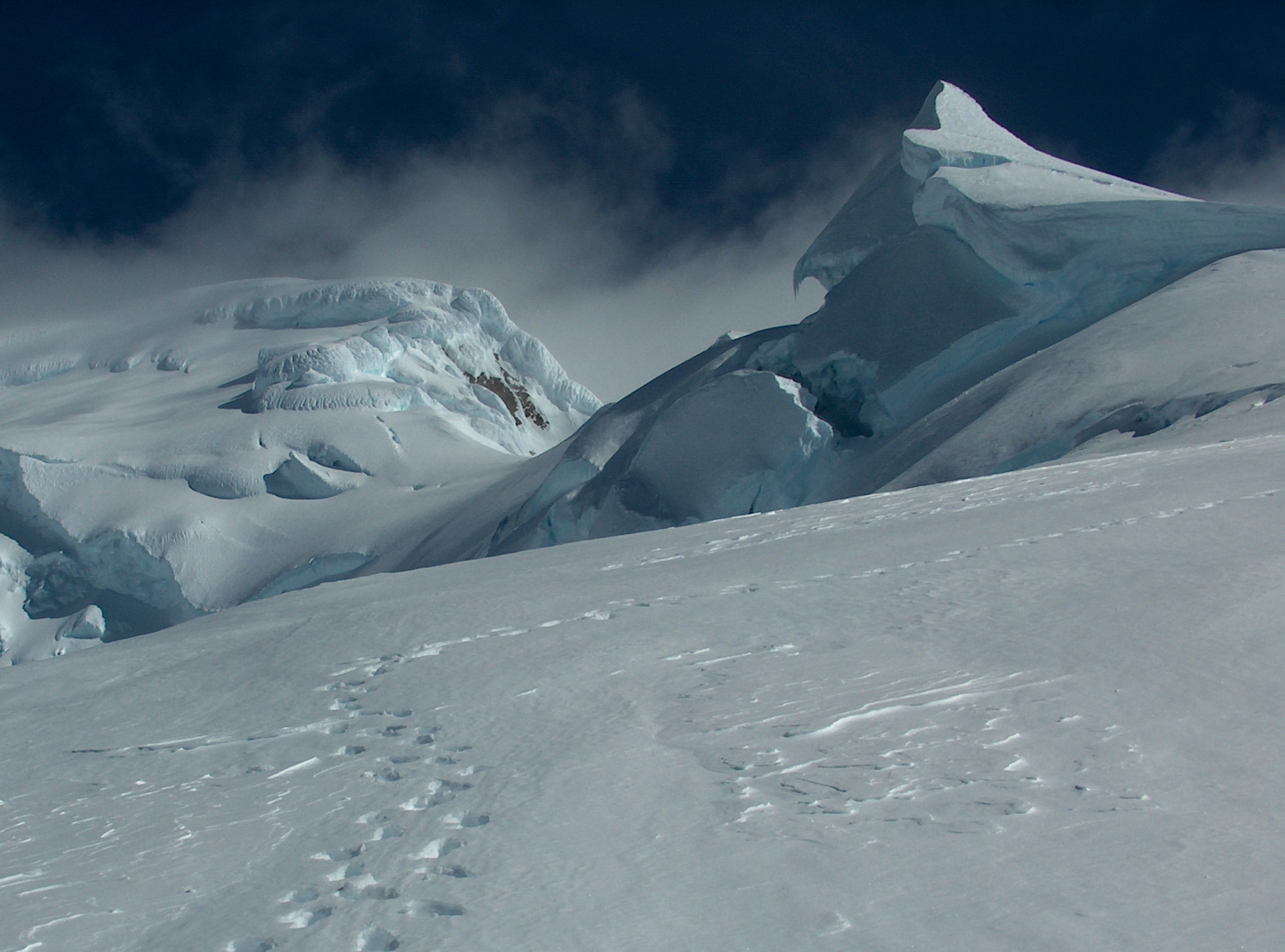
- Ongal Peak from north

Highest point
- Elevation: 1,151 m (3,776 ft)
- Coordinates: 62°39′31″S 60°07′03″W

Geography
- Location: Livingston Island, Antarctica
- Parent range: Tangra Mountains

Climbing
- First ascent: 2004 by Lyubomir Ivanov
- Easiest route: snow/glacier

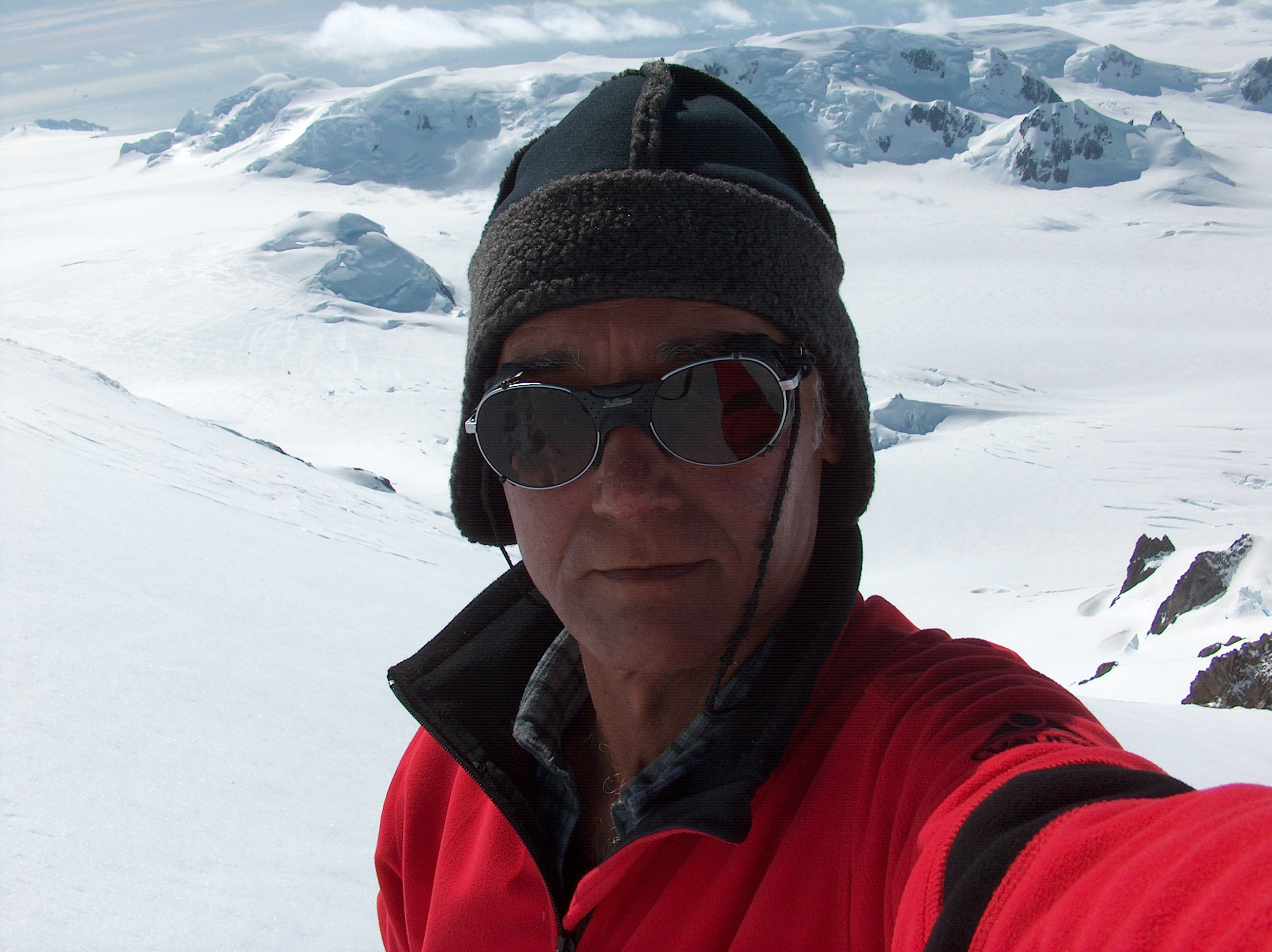
The first ascent of Ongal Peak by Lyubomir Ivanov on 21 December 2004; northwest view from the summit with Huron Glacier and Bowles Ridge in the background

Ongal Peak (Bulgarian: връх Онгъл, romanized: vrah Ongal, IPA: [ˈvrɤx ˈɔŋɡɐɫ]) is a sharp glaciated peak rising to 1151 m on Levski Ridge of Tangra Mountains, Livingston Island in the South Shetland Islands, Antarctica. It surmounts Shipka Valley on the north-northwest, and Huron Glacier and its tributaries on the north and northeast.

The peak was first ascended and surveyed on 21 December 2004 by the Bulgarian Lyubomir Ivanov from Camp Academia. It was named after the historic Ongal region of the First Bulgarian Empire located in the Danube Delta area and north of the Black Sea, in connection with the Battle of Ongal.

== Location ==
Ongal Peak is located 520 m north of Levski Peak, 1.76 km southeast of Zograf Peak, 650 m south of Komini Peak, 1.19 km south of Ravda Peak and 2.44 km west-southwest of Plana Peak. Bulgarian topographic survey Tangra 2004/05, and mapping in 2005, 2009, 2017 and 2023.

== Maps ==
- South Shetland Islands. Scale 1:200000 topographic map. DOS 610 Sheet W 62 60. Tolworth, UK, 1968.
- Islas Livingston y Decepción. Mapa topográfico a escala 1:100000. Madrid: Servicio Geográfico del Ejército, 1991.
- L.L. Ivanov et al., Antarctica: Livingston Island, South Shetland Islands (from English Strait to Morton Strait, with illustrations and ice-cover distribution), 1:100000 scale topographic map, Antarctic Place-names Commission of Bulgaria, Sofia, 2005
- L.L. Ivanov. Antarctica: Livingston Island and Greenwich, Robert, Snow and Smith Islands. Scale 1:120000 topographic map. Troyan: Manfred Wörner Foundation, 2010. ISBN 978-954-92032-9-5 (First edition 2009. ISBN 978-954-92032-6-4)
- Antarctic Digital Database (ADD). Scale 1:250000 topographic map of Antarctica. Scientific Committee on Antarctic Research (SCAR), 1993–2016.
- L.L. Ivanov. Antarctica: Livingston Island and Smith Island. Scale 1:100000 topographic map. Manfred Wörner Foundation, 2017. ISBN 978-619-90008-3-0
- A. Kamburov and L. Ivanov. Bowles Ridge and Central Tangra Mountains: Livingston Island, Antarctica. Scale 1:25000 map. Sofia: Manfred Wörner Foundation, 2023. ISBN 978-619-90008-6-1

== Gallery ==
Location of Tangra Mountains on Livingston Island in the South Shetland Islands

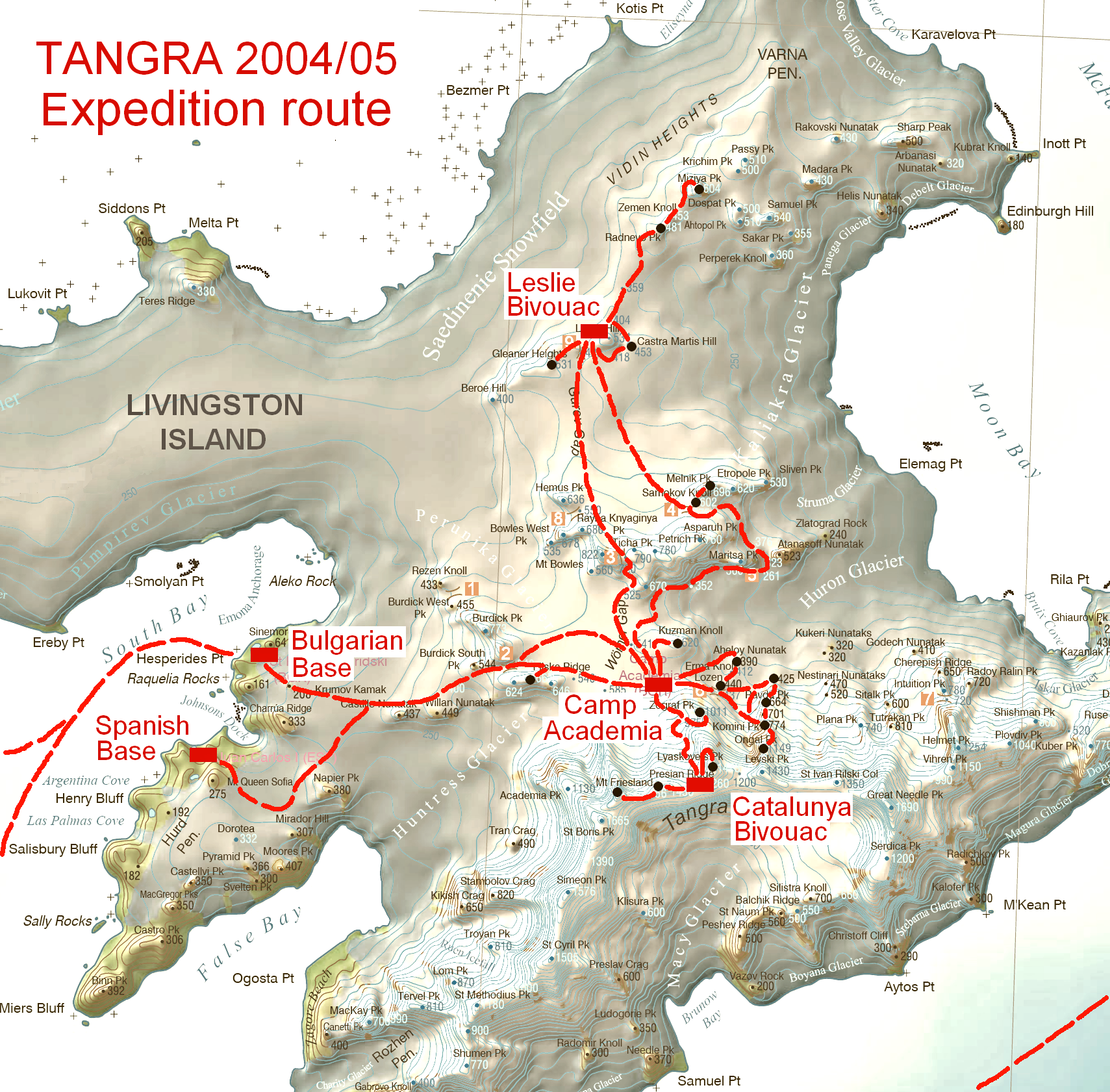
The survey route of Tangra 2004/05 including Ongal Peak

Topographic map of Livingston Island and Smith Island

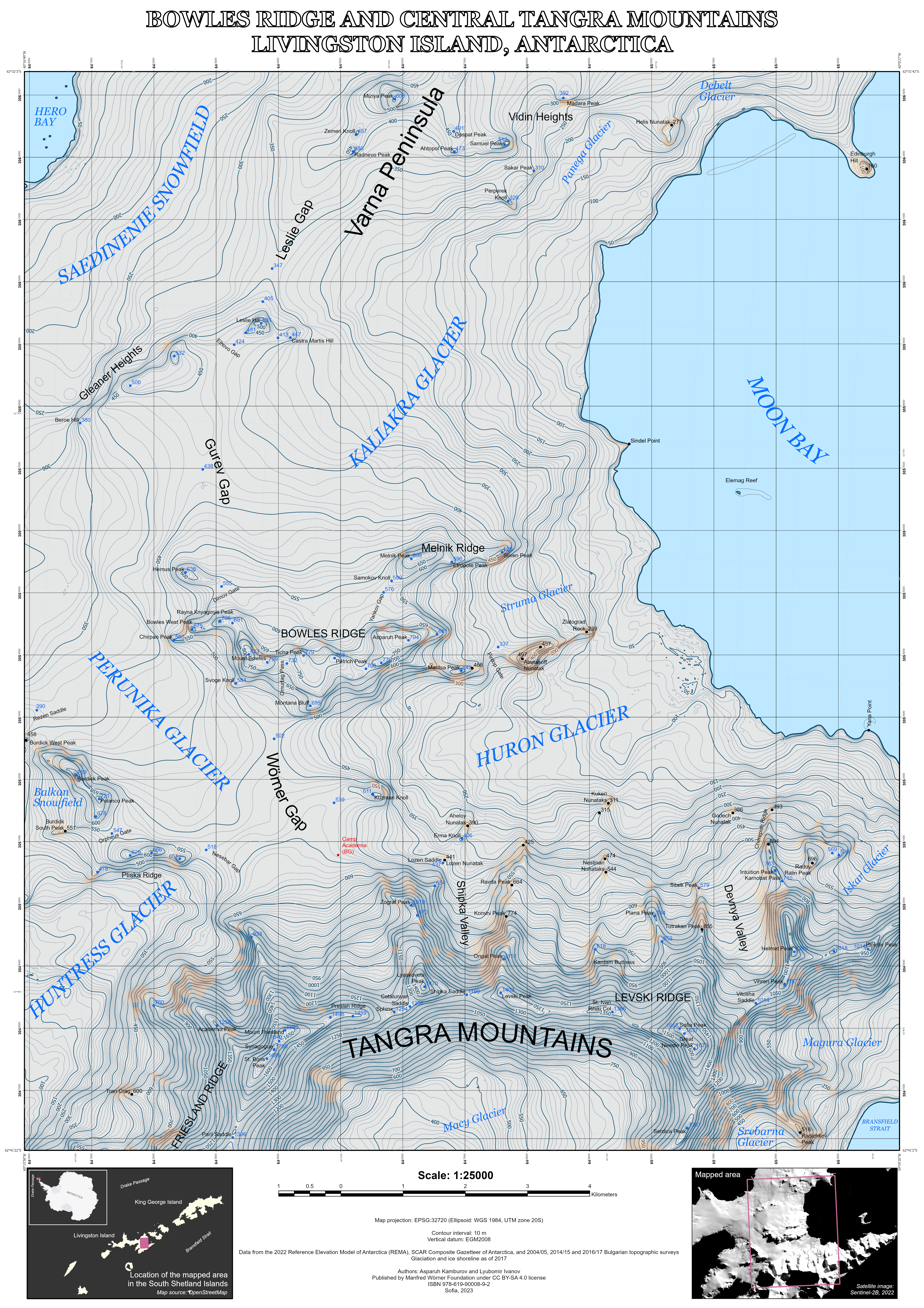
Topographic map of Bowles Ridge and central Tangra Mountains featuring Ongal Peak
