= Shipka =

Shipka may refer to:

- Shipka Monument, in Bulgaria
- Shipka (town), in Bulgaria
- Shipka Pass, in Bulgaria
- Shipka (stadium), in Asenovgrad, Bulgaria
- Shipka Saddle, in the Tangra Mountains, Livingston Island, Antarctica
- Shipka Valley, in the Tangra Mountains
- Arsenal Shipka, a kind of a submachine gun, produced in Bulgaria
- 2530 Shipka, the name of an asteroid, an abandoned probe target
- Kiernan Shipka, American actress
- Shipka (military base), a former Russian military base near Mukachevo, Ukraine
- A transliteration of Šipka, a cave in Czech Republic
