= Lozen Saddle =

Location of Tangra Mountains on Livingston Island in the South Shetland Islands

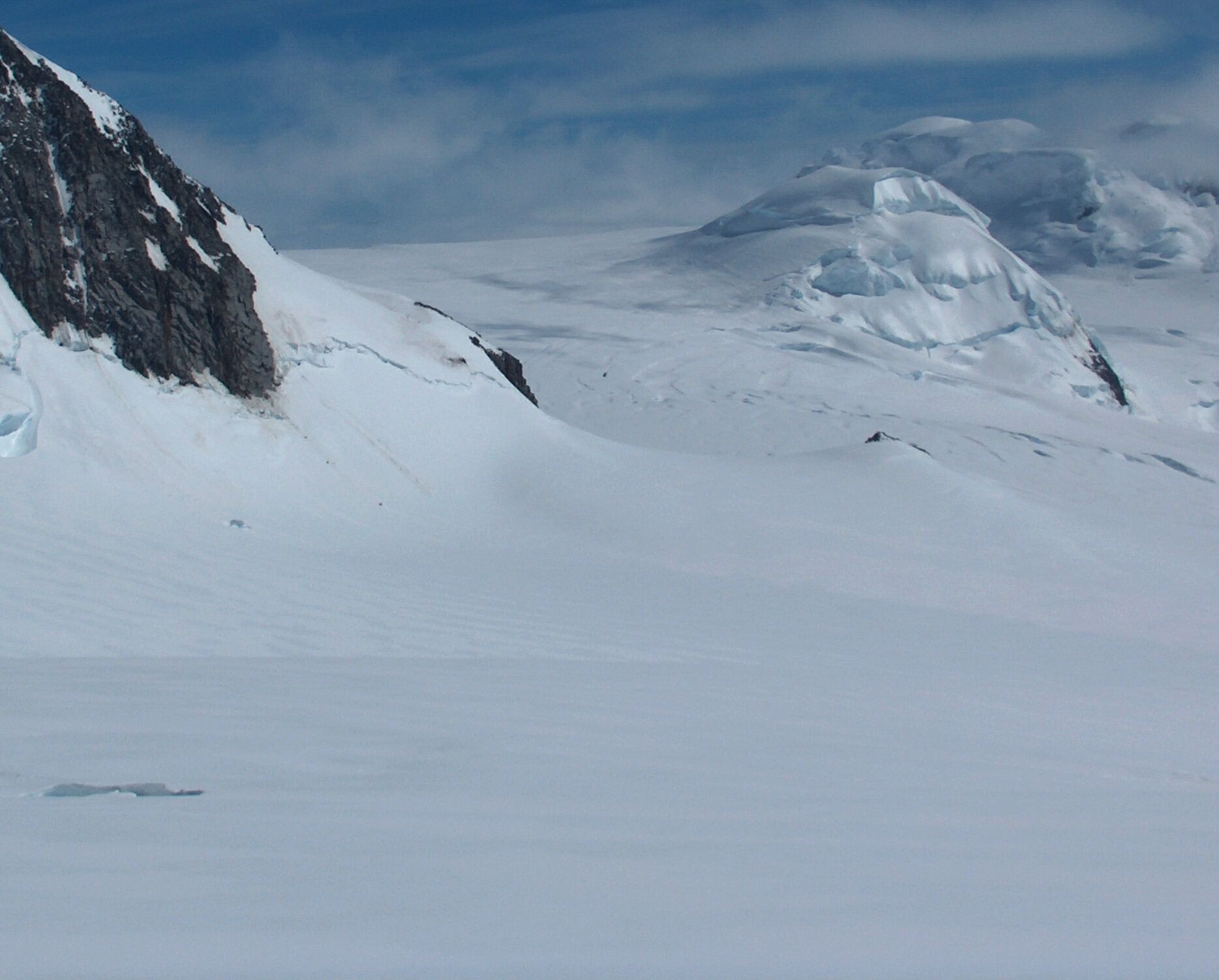
Lozen Saddle from Komini Peak, with Kuzman Knoll and Mount Bowles in the background

Topographic map of Livingston Island, Greenwich, Robert, Snow and Smith Islands

Lozen Saddle (Lozenska Sedlovina \'lo-zen-ska se-dlo-vi-'na\) is a 437 m high saddle situated between Lozen Nunatak and Zograf Peak in Tangra Mountains, eastern Livingston Island in the South Shetland Islands, Antarctica which provides overland access from the Wörner Gap area to the Shipka Valley. The saddle was first crossed by the Bulgarian Lyubomir Ivanov from Camp Academia on 17 December 2004, and takes its name from the adjacent Lozen Nunatak.

== Location ==
The saddle is located at 62°38′43″S 60°08′20″W which is 5.29 km east of Orpheus Gate, 3.44 km south-southwest of Pirdop Gate and 5.46 km west of Karnobat Pass (Bulgarian topographic survey Tangra 2004/05, and mapping in 2005 and 2009).

== Maps ==
- L.L. Ivanov et al. Antarctica: Livingston Island and Greenwich Island, South Shetland Islands. Scale 1:100000 topographic map. Sofia: Antarctic Place-names Commission of Bulgaria, 2005.
- L.L. Ivanov. Antarctica: Livingston Island and Greenwich, Robert, Snow and Smith Islands. Scale 1:120000 topographic map. Troyan: Manfred Wörner Foundation, 2009.
- A. Kamburov and L. Ivanov. Bowles Ridge and Central Tangra Mountains: Livingston Island, Antarctica. Scale 1:25000 map. Sofia: Manfred Wörner Foundation, 2023. ISBN 978-619-90008-6-1
