= Zograf Peak =

Peak in Antarctica

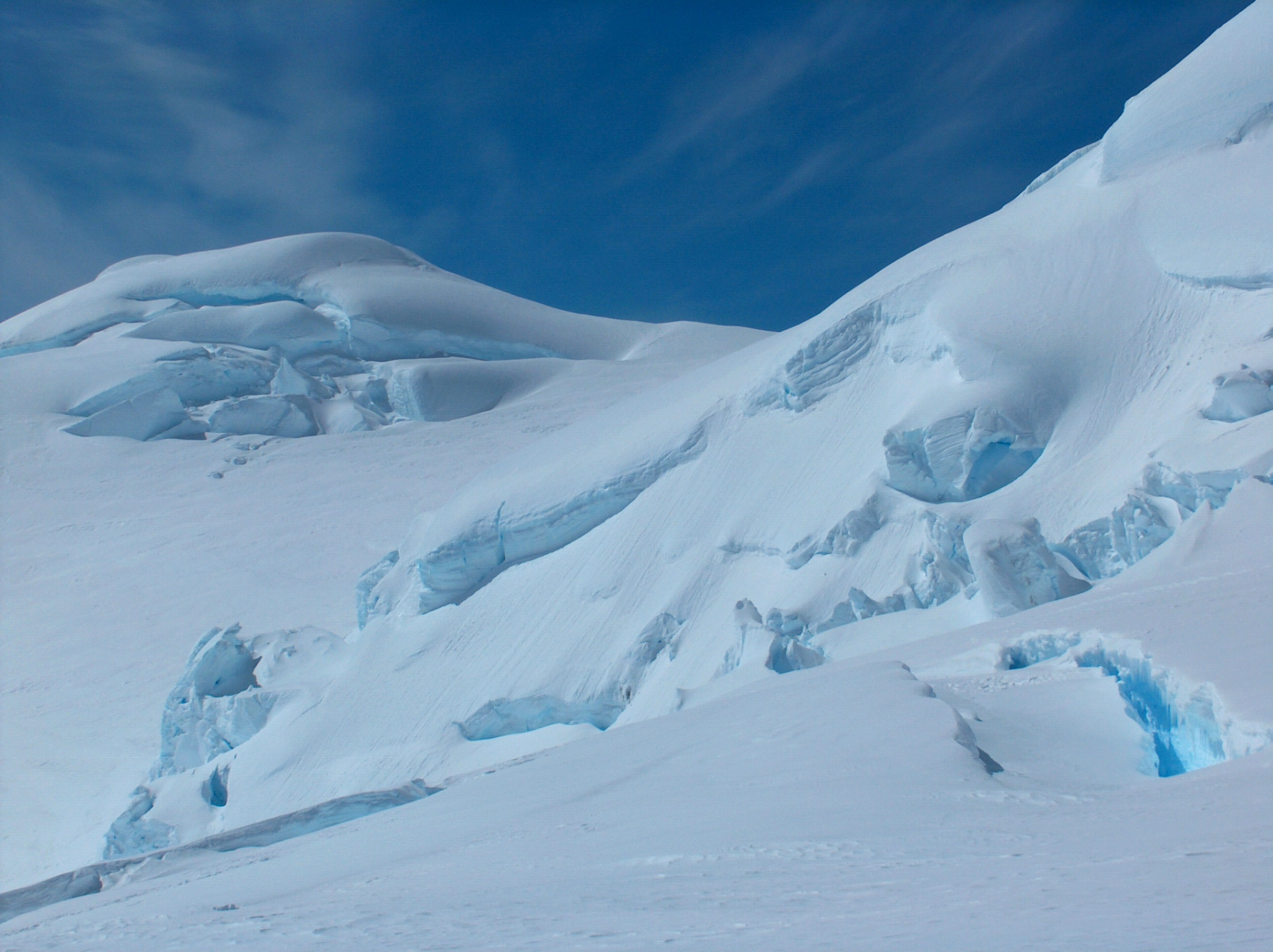
- Zograf Peak from near Catalunyan Saddle

Highest point
- Elevation: 1,010 m (3,310 ft)
- Coordinates: 62°39′6.4″S 60°08′54″W

Geography
- Location within Antarctic Peninsula
- Location: Livingston Island, Antarctica
- Parent range: Tangra Mountains

Climbing
- First ascent: 2004
- Easiest route: Snow/glacier climb

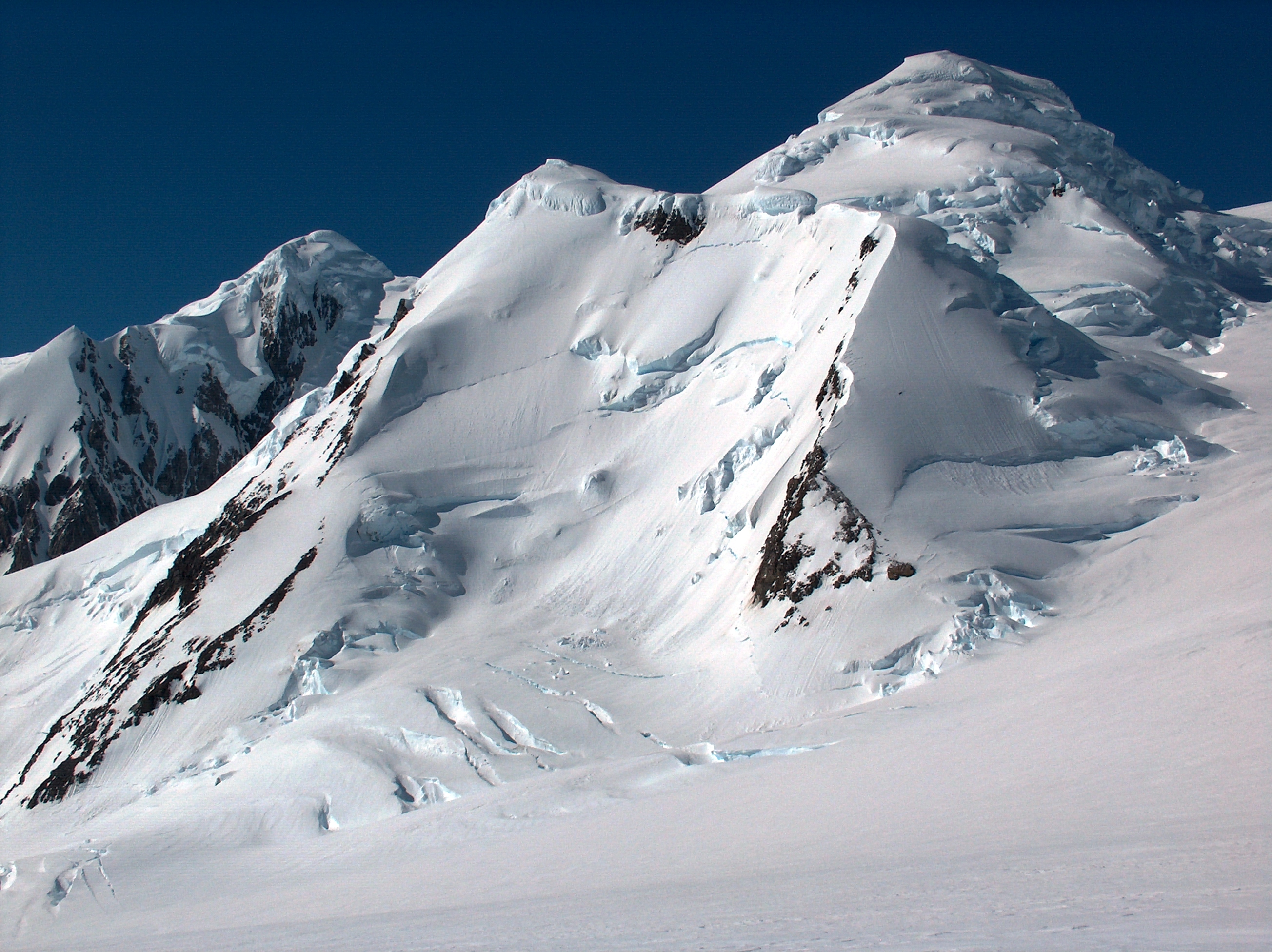
Zograf Peak from Camp Academia area, with Levski Peak on the left and Lyaskovets Peak on the right

Topographic map of Livingston Island and Smith Island

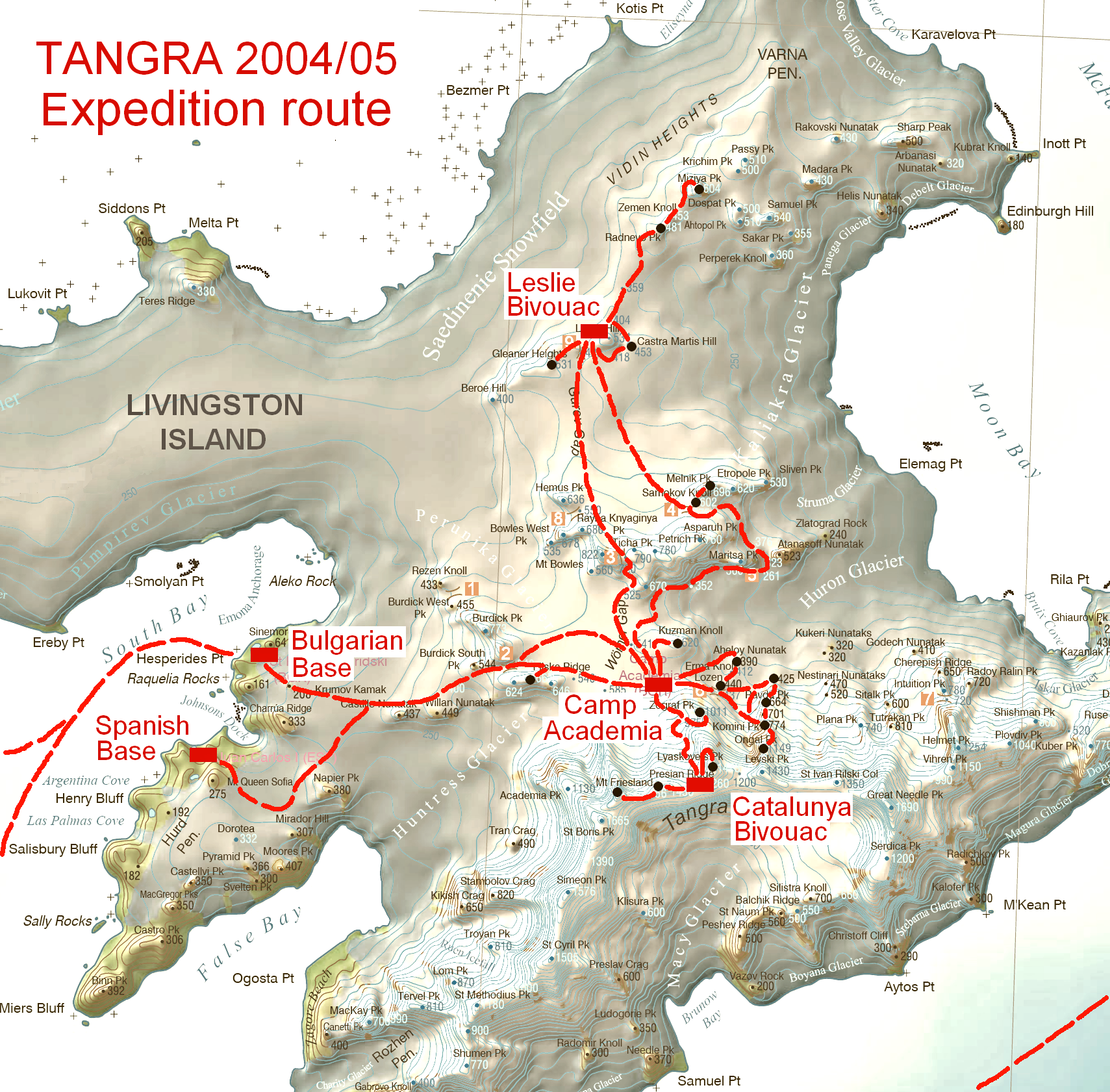
Tangra 2004/05 survey route including Zograf Peak

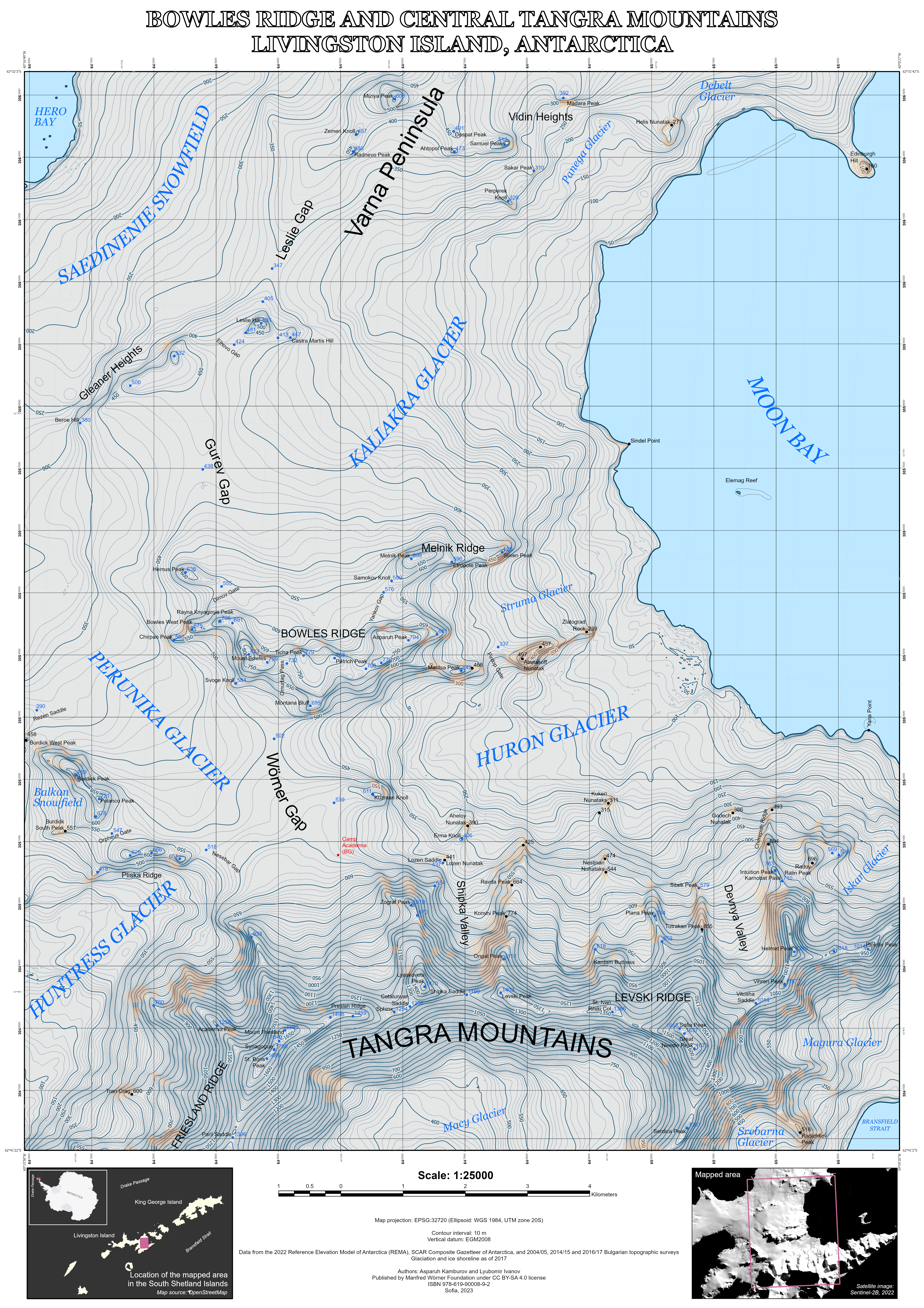
Topographic map of Bowles Ridge and central Tangra Mountains featuring Zograf Peak

Zograf Peak (Greek: κορυφή Ζωγράφου, romanized: koryfi Zografou, Bulgarian: връх Зограф, romanized: vrah Zograf, IPA: [ˈvrɤɣ zoˈɡraf]) rises to 1,010 m (3,310 ft) at the northeast extremity of Friesland Ridge in Tangra Mountains, Livingston Island in the South Shetland Islands, Antarctica. The peak is heavily glaciated and crevassed, with precipitous and partly ice-free northern slopes. The peak surmounts Huron Glacier to the north and Shipka Valley to the east, and is accessible via the saddle of elevation 975 m linking it to the north rib of Lyaskovets Peak. The peak is linked to the northeast by Lozen Saddle to Lozen Nunatak, Erma Knoll and Aheloy Nunatak.

The peak is named after the Bulgarian Zograf Monastery on Mount Athos.

First ascent by Lyubomir Ivanov from Camp Academia on 31 December 2004.

== Location ==
The peak is located 1.33 km north by west of Lyaskovets Peak, 4.26 km east by south of Pliska Peak, 1.88 km south-southeast of Kuzman Knoll, 3.9 km south by west of Maritsa Peak and 1.55 km west of Komini Peak.

== Camp Academia ==
The northwestern foothills of Zograf Peak are known as Camp Academia, a central location in the upper Huron Glacier, Wörner Gap area, eastern Livingston Island (62°38′41.9″S 60°10′18″W). This location can be accessed by an 11 km route from St. Kliment Ohridski base, or a 12.5 km route from Juan Carlos I base. The site offers convenient overland access to the Tangra Mountains to the south; Bowles Ridge, Vidin Heights, Kaliakra Glacier and Saedinenie Snowfield areas to the north; Huron Glacier to the east and Perunika Glacier and Huntress Glacier to the west.

Camp Academia hosted the base camp of the Bulgarian topographic survey Tangra 2004/05 from 3 December 2004 until 2 January 2005 and was named for the Bulgarian Academy of Sciences in appreciation of that academy's contribution to Antarctic exploration. Since 2004 the site has been designated as the summer post office Tangra 1091 of the Bulgarian Posts Plc.

Zograf Peak and Camp Academia were mapped in 2005, 2009 and 2017 from the topographic survey Tangra 2004/05, and in 2023.

== See also ==
- Tangra 2004/05
- Tangra Mountains

== Maps ==
- South Shetland Islands. Scale 1:200000 topographic map. DOS 610 Sheet W 62 60. Tolworth, UK, 1968.
- Islas Livingston y Decepción. Mapa topográfico a escala 1:100000. Madrid: Servicio Geográfico del Ejército, 1991.
- L.L. Ivanov et al., Antarctica: Livingston Island, South Shetland Islands (from English Strait to Morton Strait, with illustrations and ice-cover distribution), 1:100000 scale topographic map, Antarctic Place-names Commission of Bulgaria, Sofia, 2005
- L.L. Ivanov. Antarctica: Livingston Island and Greenwich, Robert, Snow and Smith Islands. Scale 1:120000 topographic map. Troyan: Manfred Wörner Foundation, 2010. ISBN 978-954-92032-9-5 (First edition 2009. ISBN 978-954-92032-6-4)
- Antarctic Digital Database (ADD). Scale 1:250000 topographic map of Antarctica. Scientific Committee on Antarctic Research (SCAR), 1993–2016.
- L.L. Ivanov. Antarctica: Livingston Island and Smith Island. Scale 1:100000 topographic map. Manfred Wörner Foundation, 2017. ISBN 978-619-90008-3-0
- A. Kamburov and L. Ivanov. Bowles Ridge and Central Tangra Mountains: Livingston Island, Antarctica. Scale 1:25000 map. Sofia: Manfred Wörner Foundation, 2023. ISBN 978-619-90008-6-1
