= Pirdop Gate =

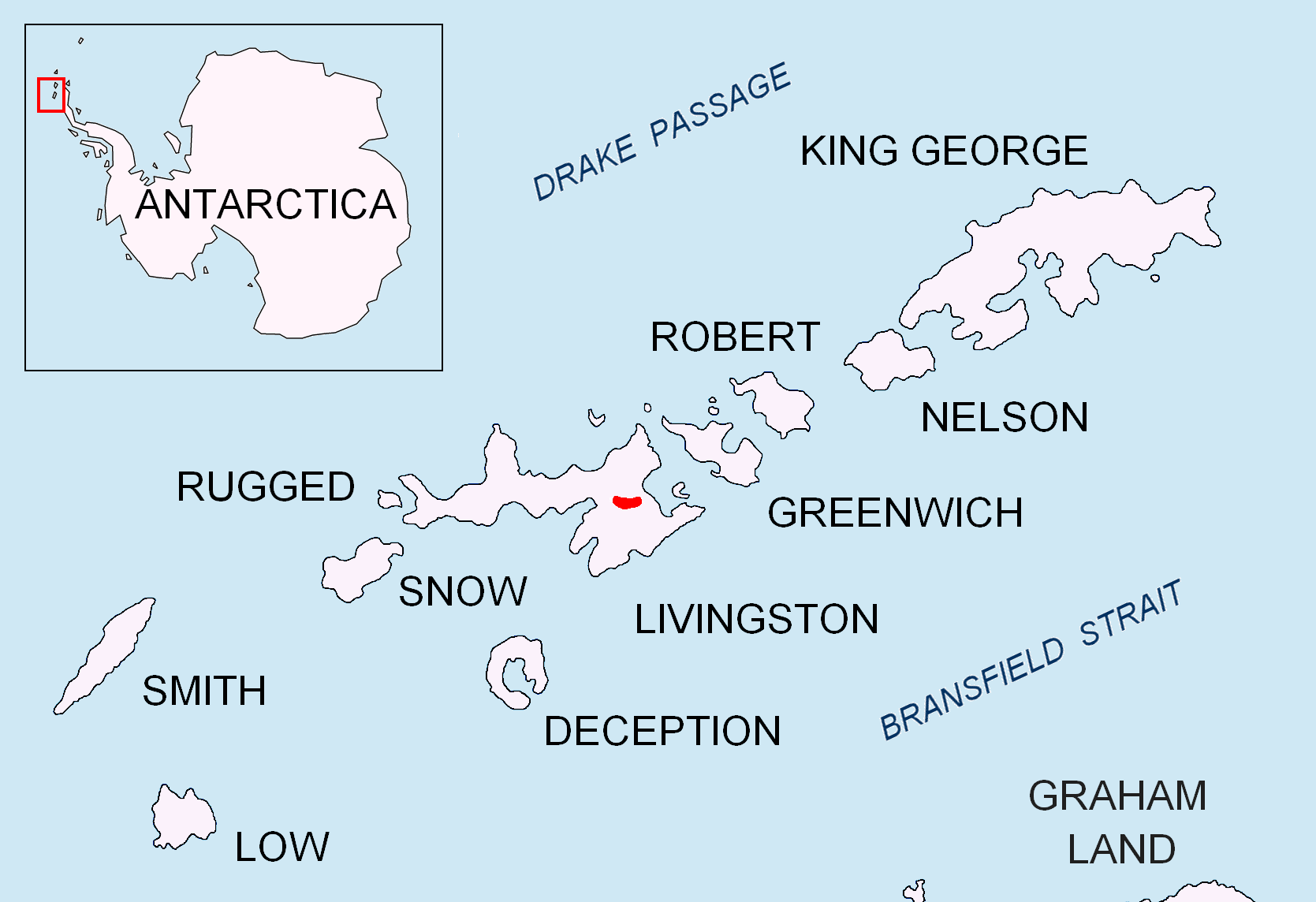
Location of Bowles Ridge on Livingston Island in the South Shetland Islands.

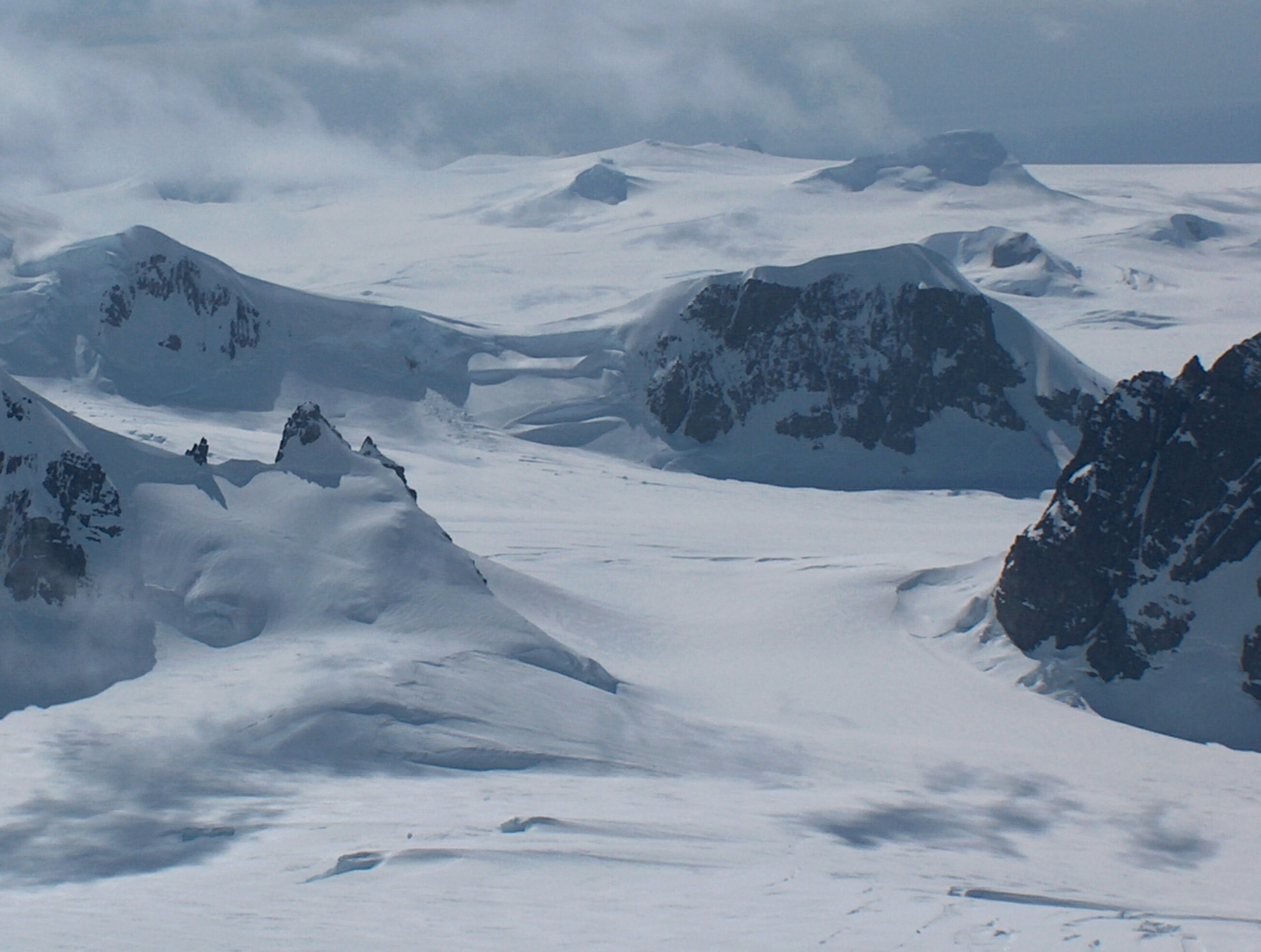
Pirdop Gate from Komini Peak.

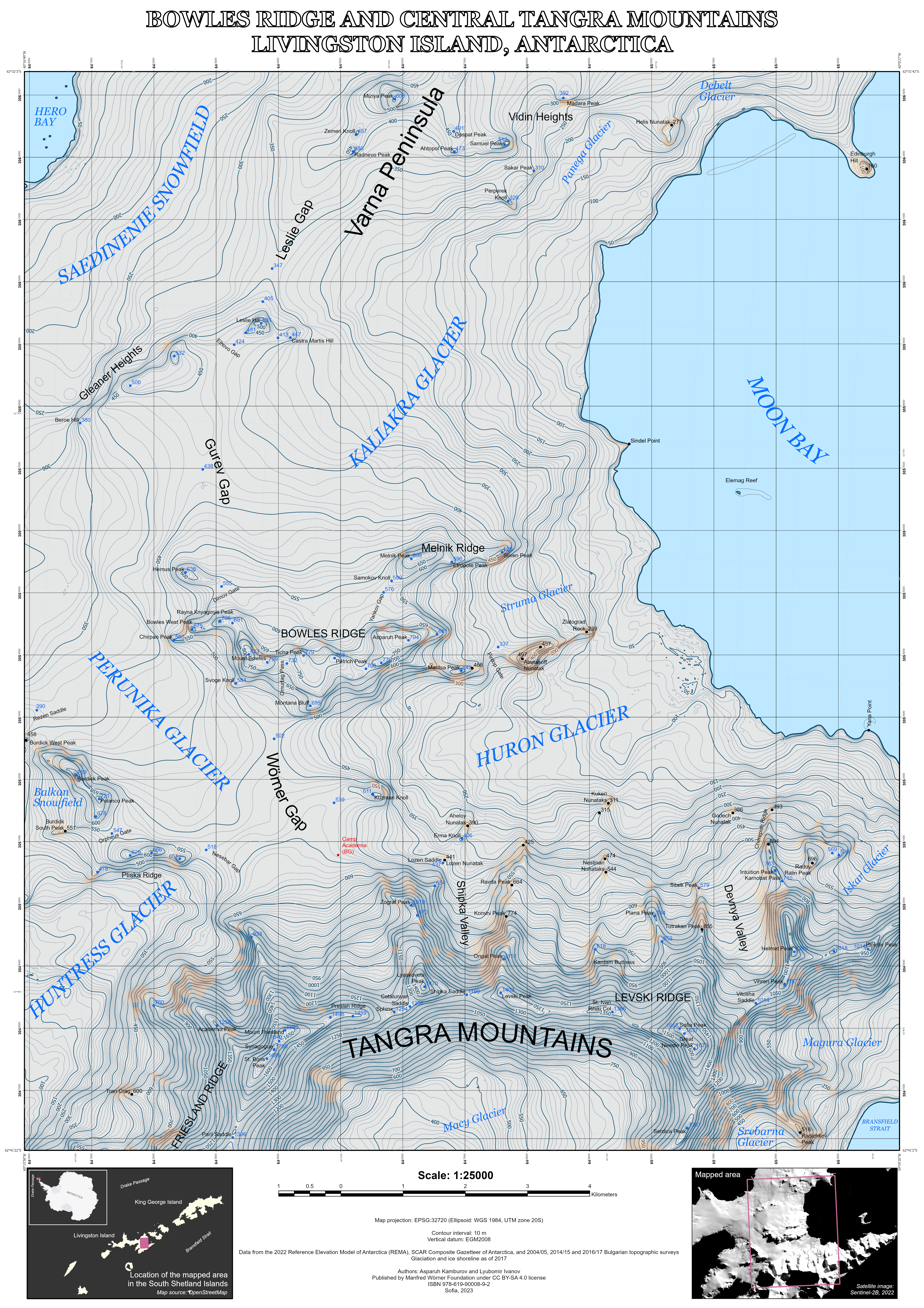
Topographic map of Bowles Ridge and central Tangra Mountains featuring Pirdop Gate

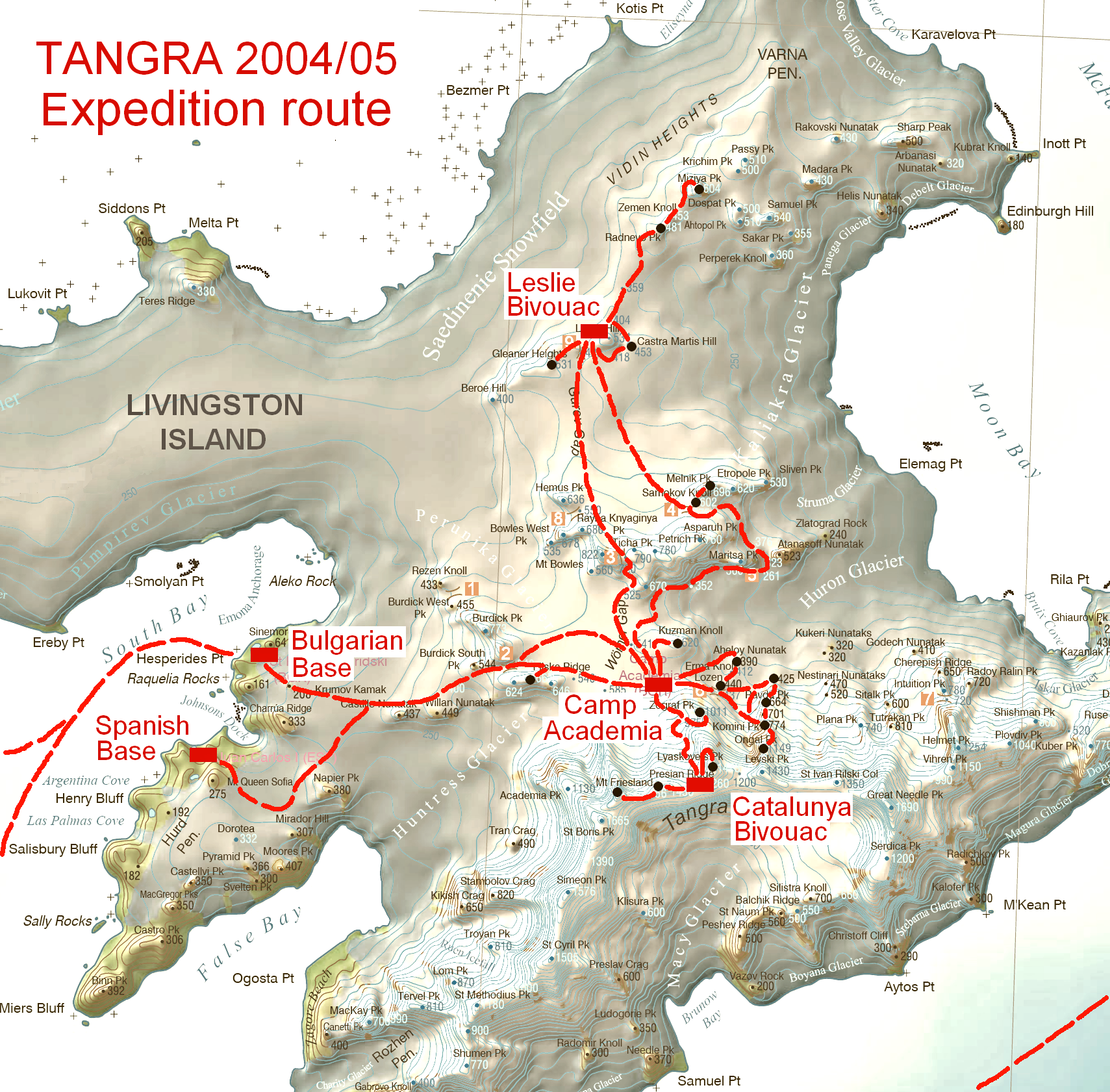
Tangra 2004/05 survey route including Pirdop Gate.

Pirdop Gate (Pirdopska Porta \pir-'dop-ska 'por-ta\) is a 300 m (980 ft) wide pass between Maritsa Peak and Atanasoff Nunatak in eastern Bowles Ridge, Livingston Island in the South Shetland Islands, Antarctica. It has an elevation of 376 m (1,234 ft) at its northern entrance from Struma Glacier, and 261 m (856 ft) at the southern entrance from Huron Glacier. It forms part of an overland route between middle Huron Glacier and upper Kaliakra Glacier. The pass was first crossed by the Bulgarians Lyubomir Ivanov and Doychin Vasilev from Camp Academia on 28 December 2004. Named after the town of Pirdop in Central Bulgaria.

== Location ==
The pass is located at 62°36′54″S 60°07′40″W, which is 6.82 km east-northeast of Orpheus Gate, 3.25 km east of Omurtag Pass, 2.16 km southeast of Yankov Gap, 5.86 km northwest of Karnobat Pass and 3.44 km north-northeast of Lozen Saddle (Bulgarian topographic survey Tangra 2004/05, and mapping in 2005 and 2009).

== Maps ==
- L.L. Ivanov et al. Antarctica: Livingston Island and Greenwich Island, South Shetland Islands. Scale 1:100000 topographic map. Sofia: Antarctic Place-names Commission of Bulgaria, 2005.
- L.L. Ivanov. Antarctica: Livingston Island and Greenwich, Robert, Snow and Smith Islands. Scale 1:120000 topographic map. Troyan: Manfred Wörner Foundation, 2009. ISBN 978-954-92032-6-4
- A. Kamburov and L. Ivanov. Bowles Ridge and Central Tangra Mountains: Livingston Island, Antarctica. Scale 1:25000 map. Sofia: Manfred Wörner Foundation, 2023. ISBN 978-619-90008-6-1
