= Lozen Nunatak =

Location of Tangra Mountains on Livingston Island in the South Shetland Islands.

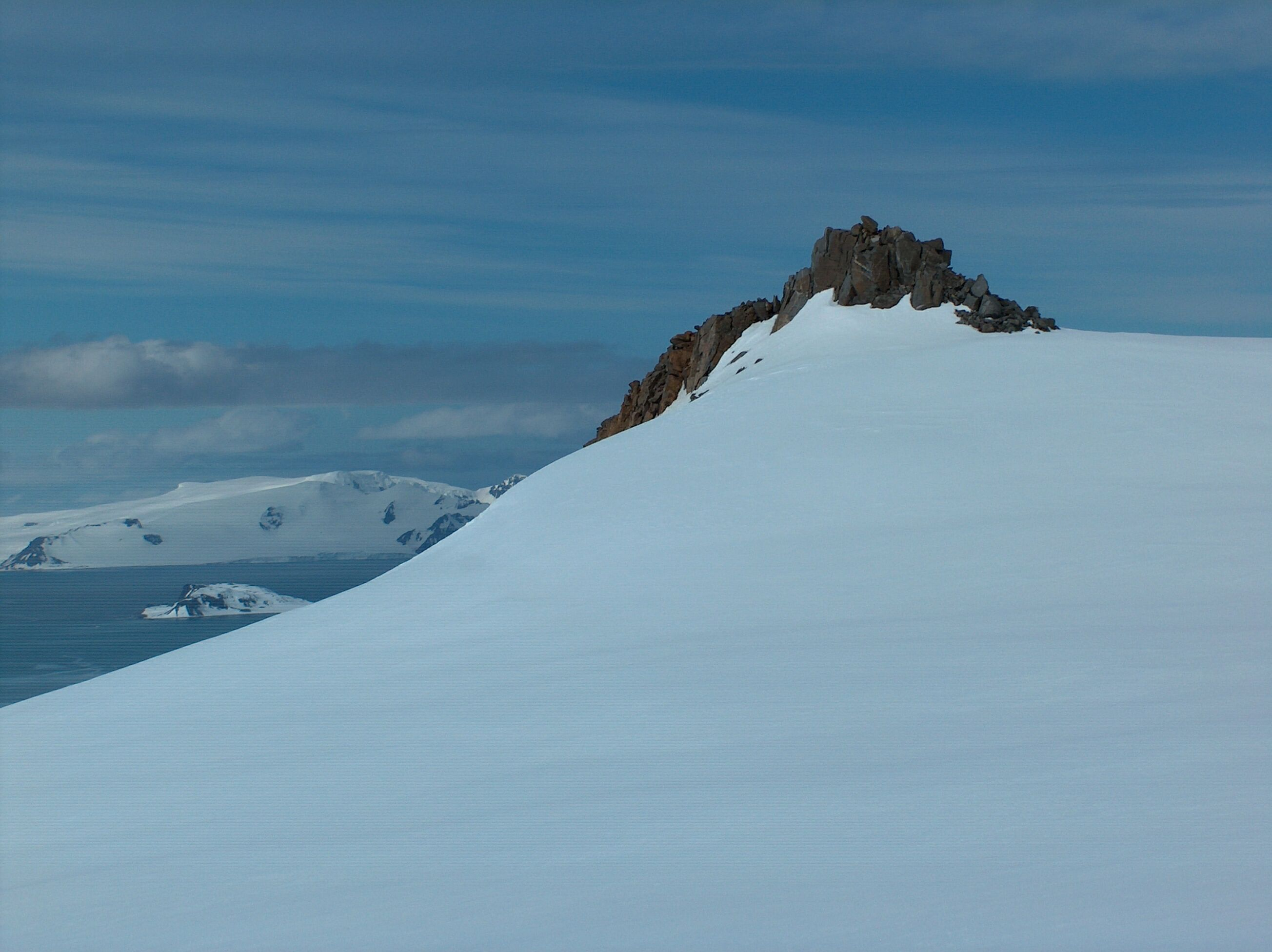
Lozen Nunatak from west.

Topographic map of Livingston Island, Greenwich, Robert, Snow and Smith Islands.

Lozen Nunatak (Bulgarian: Лозенски нунатак, romanized: Lozenski nunatak, IPA: [ˈɫɔzɛnski ˈnunɐtɐk]) is a 440m hill in upper Huron Glacier, Livingston Island. It is part of a minor ridge in the north foothills of Tangra Mountains including also Erma Knoll and Aheloy Nunatak, and linked to Zograf Peak by Lozen Saddle. The hill was first visited on 17 December 2004 by the Bulgarian Lyubomir Ivanov from Camp Academia. It is named after the Lozen Monastery of St. Spas (Holy Saviour) in western Bulgaria.

== Location ==
The nunatak is located at 62°38′41.9″S 60°08′18.5″W which is 1.55 km southeast of Kuzman Knoll, 1.14 km west-northwest of Ravda Peak and 910 m northeast of Zograf Peak (Bulgarian topographic survey Tangra 2004/05, and mapping in 2005 and 2009).

== Maps ==
- L.L. Ivanov et al. Antarctica: Livingston Island and Greenwich Island, South Shetland Islands. Scale 1:100000 topographic map. Sofia: Antarctic Place-names Commission of Bulgaria, 2005.
- L.L. Ivanov. Antarctica: Livingston Island and Greenwich, Robert, Snow and Smith Islands. Scale 1:120000 topographic map. Troyan: Manfred Wörner Foundation, 2009.
- A. Kamburov and L. Ivanov. Bowles Ridge and Central Tangra Mountains: Livingston Island, Antarctica. Scale 1:25000 map. Sofia: Manfred Wörner Foundation, 2023. ISBN 978-619-90008-6-1
