= Karnobat Pass =

Location of Tangra Mountains on Livingston Island in the South Shetland Islands.

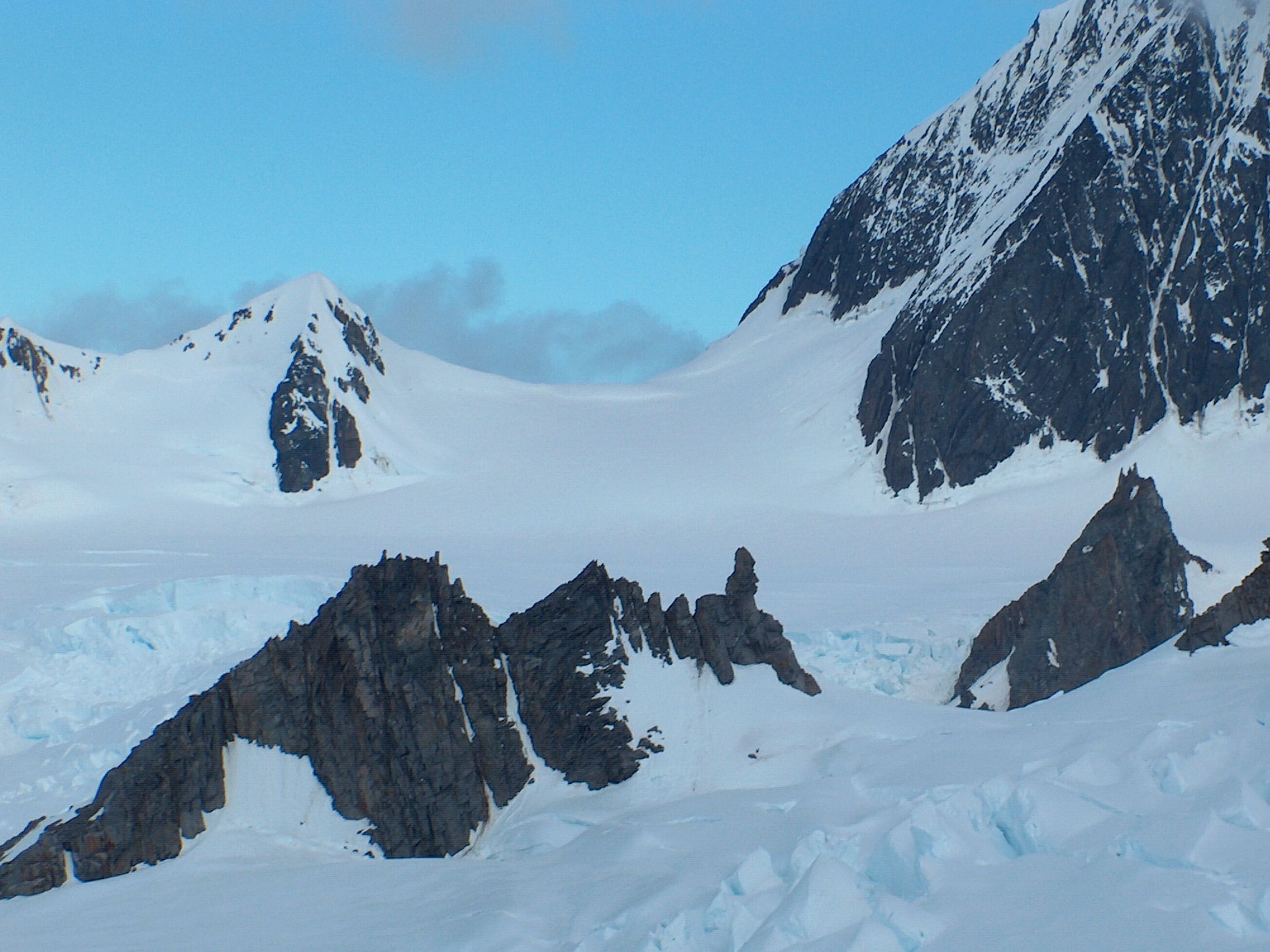
Karnobat Pass from near Ravda Peak.

Topographic map of Livingston Island, Greenwich, Robert, Snow and Smith Islands.

Karnobat Pass (Karnobatski Prohod \kar-no-'bat-ski 'pro-hod\) is a 220 m wide and 720 m high pass in Levski Ridge in Tangra Mountains, Livingston Island in the South Shetland Islands, Antarctica. It is bounded by Helmet Peak to the south and Intuition Peak to the north, and is situated 5.46 km east of Lozen Saddle and 5.86 km southeast of Pirdop Gate. The pass provides overland access from Devnya Valley to Iskar Glacier area. It was named after the town of Karnobat in eastern Bulgaria.

== Location ==
The pass is located at 62°38′47″S 60°01′56.5″W (Bulgarian mapping in 2005 and 2009 from the Tangra 2004/05 Survey).

== Maps ==
- L.L. Ivanov et al. Antarctica: Livingston Island and Greenwich Island, South Shetland Islands. Scale 1:100000 topographic map. Sofia: Antarctic Place-names Commission of Bulgaria, 2005.
- L.L. Ivanov. Antarctica: Livingston Island and Greenwich, Robert, Snow and Smith Islands. Scale 1:120000 topographic map. Troyan: Manfred Wörner Foundation, 2009.
- A. Kamburov and L. Ivanov. Bowles Ridge and Central Tangra Mountains: Livingston Island, Antarctica. Scale 1:25000 map. Sofia: Manfred Wörner Foundation, 2023. ISBN 978-619-90008-6-1
