= Komini Peak =

Mountain in Antarctica

Location of Tangra Mountains on Livingston Island in the South Shetland Islands

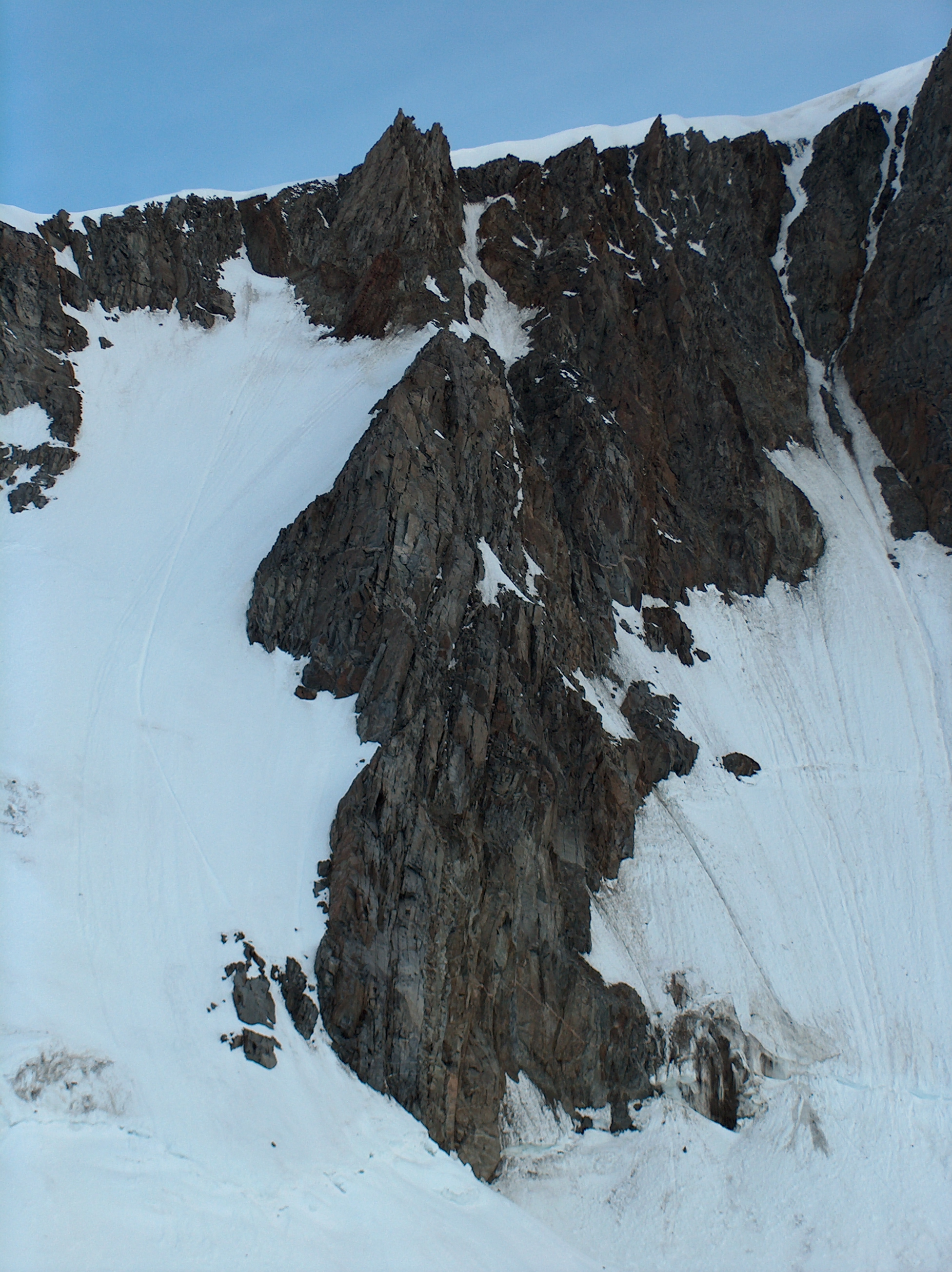
Komini Peak from Shipka Valley

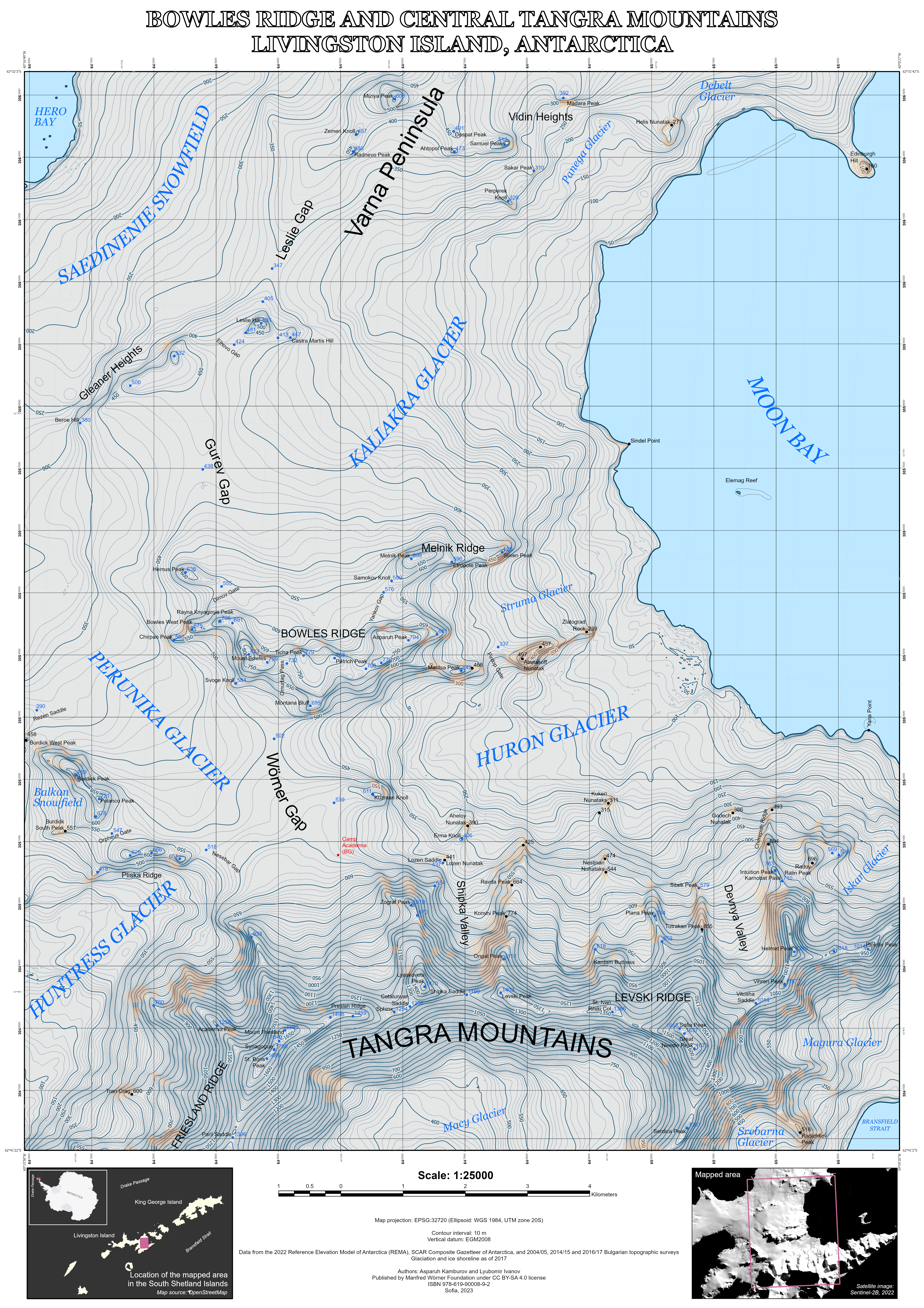
Topographic map of Bowles Ridge and central Tangra Mountains

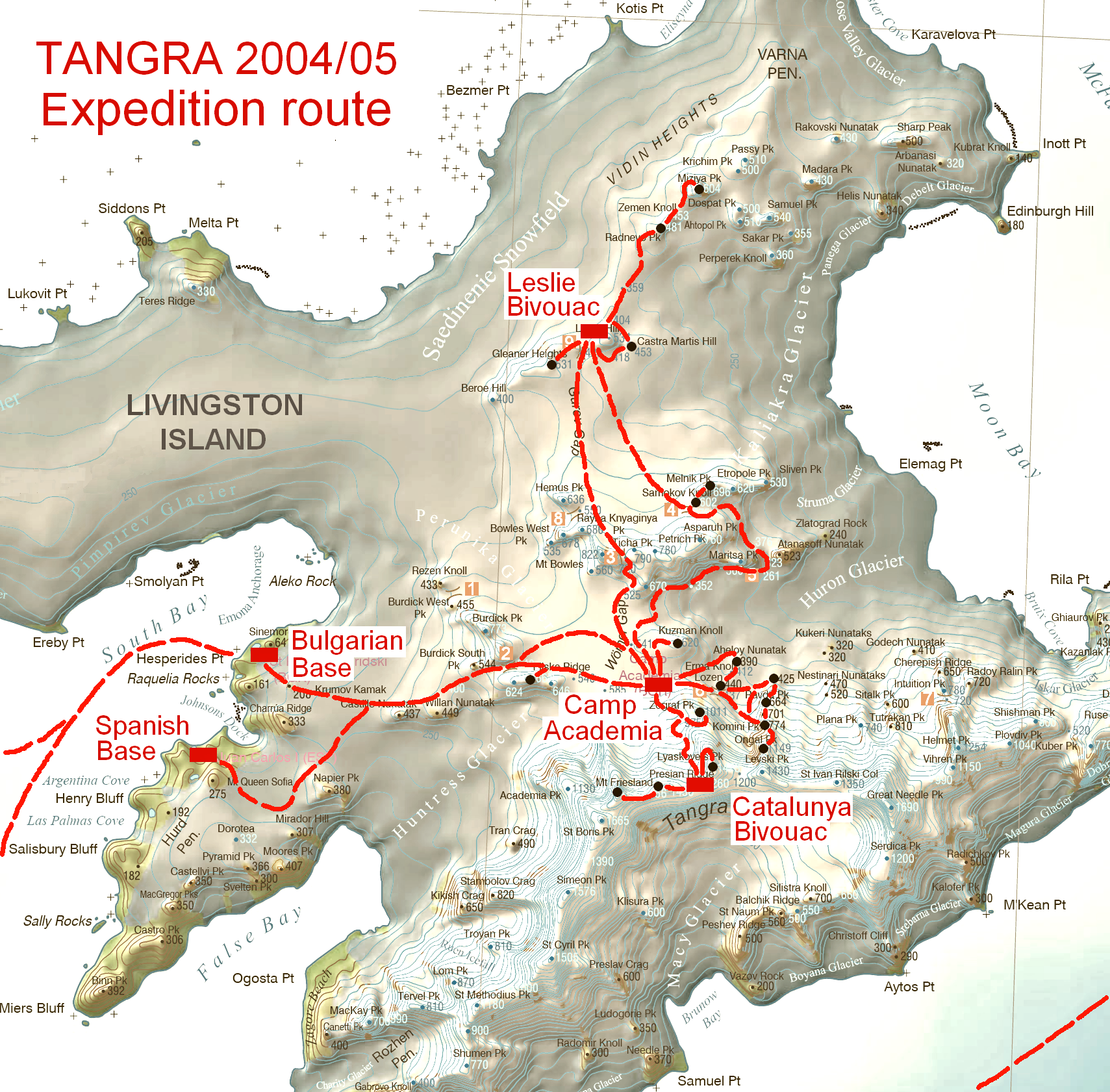
Tangra 2004/05 survey route.

Komini Peak (Bulgarian: връх Комини, romanized: vrah Komini, IPA: [ˈvrɤx koˈmini]) is a peak with an elevation of 774 m (2,539 ft) on the north slopes of Levski Peak, in the Tangra Mountains, in Livingston Island, Antarctica.

The peak has precipitous rocky western slopes and was first climbed by Lyubomir Ivanov from Camp Academia by way of its 212 m (696 ft) high western rock wall on 21 December 2004.

The feature is named after Komini Peak in Vitosha Mountain, western Bulgaria.

== Location ==
The peak is located at 62°39′10″S 60°07′05.7″W which is 1.16 km (0.72 mi) north of Levski Peak, 1.7 km (1.1 mi) northeast of Lyaskovets Peak, 1.54 km (0.96 mi) east of Zograf Peak and 1.35 km (0.84 mi) southeast of Lozen Nunatak, 540 m (590 yd) south of Ravda Peak, 1.71 km (1.06 mi) southwest of Nestinari Nunataks and 2.36 km (1.47 mi) west of Plana Peak (Bulgarian topographic survey Tangra 2004/05, and mapping in 2005, 2009 and 2023).

== Maps ==
- L.L. Ivanov et al. Antarctica: Livingston Island and Greenwich Island, South Shetland Islands. Scale 1:100000 topographic map. Sofia: Antarctic Place-names Commission of Bulgaria, 2005.
- L.L. Ivanov. Antarctica: Livingston Island and Greenwich, Robert, Snow and Smith Islands. Scale 1:120000 topographic map. Troyan: Manfred Wörner Foundation, 2009. ISBN 978-954-92032-6-4
- Antarctic Digital Database (ADD). Scale 1:250000 topographic map of Antarctica. Scientific Committee on Antarctic Research (SCAR). Since 1993, regularly upgraded and updated.
- L.L. Ivanov. Antarctica: Livingston Island and Smith Island. Scale 1:100000 topographic map. Manfred Wörner Foundation, 2017. ISBN 978-619-90008-3-0
- A. Kamburov and L. Ivanov. Bowles Ridge and Central Tangra Mountains: Livingston Island, Antarctica. Scale 1:25000 map. Sofia: Manfred Wörner Foundation, 2023. ISBN 978-619-90008-6-1
