= Ravda Peak =

Rocky peak in the South Shetland Islands, Antarctica

Location of Tangra Mountains on Livingston Island in the South Shetland Islands.

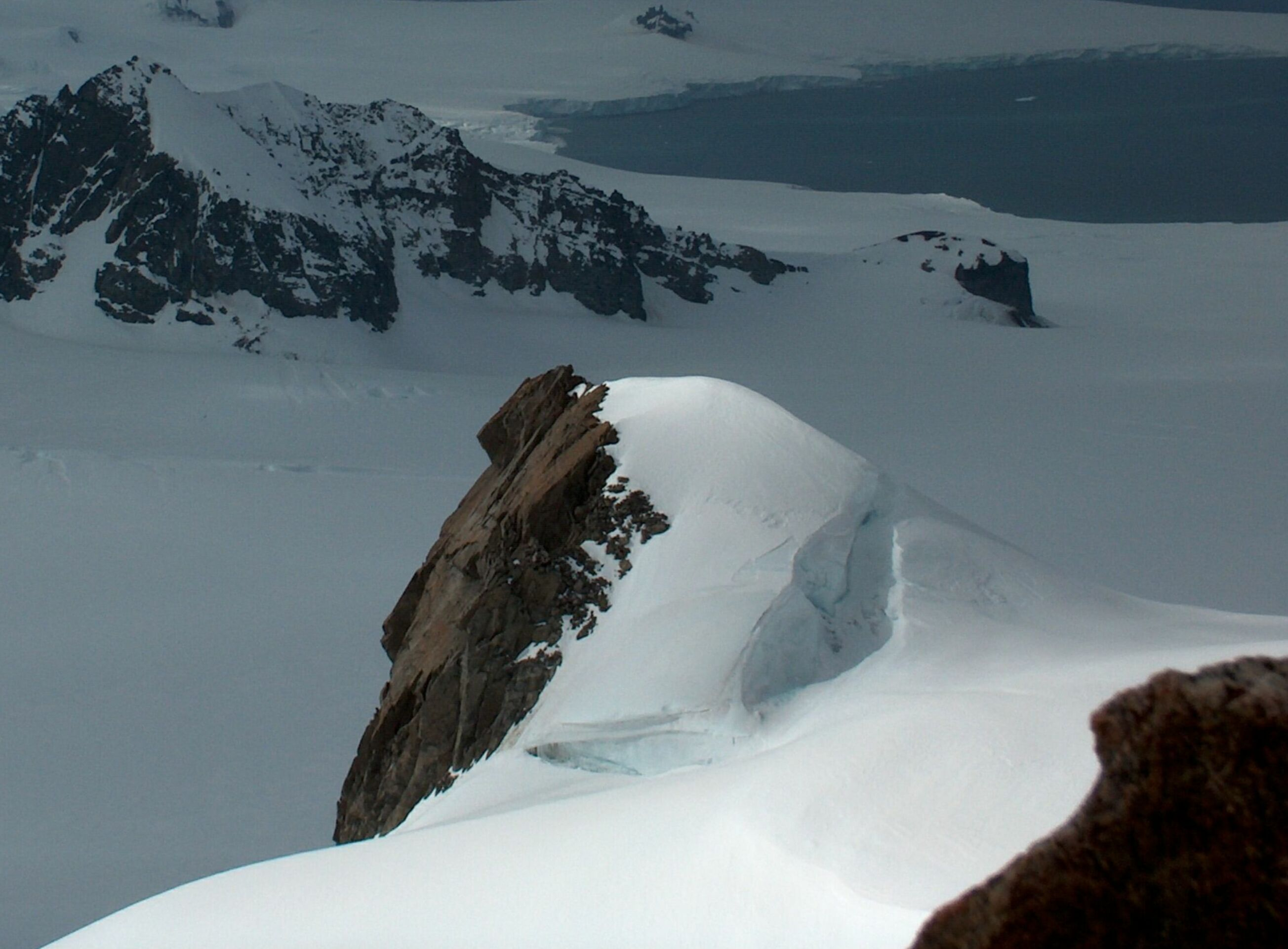
Ravda Peak from near Komini Peak.

Topographic map of Livingston Island and Smith Island.

Ravda Peak (Bulgarian: връх Равда, romanized: vrah Ravda, IPA: [ˈvrɤx ˈravdɐ]) is a rocky peak of elevation 664 m (2,178 ft) in Levski Ridge, Tangra Mountains, Livingston Island in the South Shetland Islands, Antarctica. Situated on the side ridge projecting northwards from Levski Peak into Huron Glacier. The peak was first ascended by the Bulgarian Lyubomir Ivanov from Camp Academia on 21 December 2004.

The peak is named after the Black Sea settlement of Ravda, Bulgaria.

== Location ==
The peak is located at 62°38′52.6″S 60°07′02.2″W which is 1.71 km north of Levski Peak, 540 m north of Komini Peak, 1.14 km east-southeast of Lozen Nunatak, 1.16 km southeast of Aheloy Nunatak, 3.52 km south-southeast of Maritsa Peak and 1.49 km west-southwest of Nestinari Nunataks (Bulgarian topographic survey Tangra 2004/05, and mapping in 2005 and 2009).

== Maps ==
- L.L. Ivanov et al. Antarctica: Livingston Island and Greenwich Island, South Shetland Islands. Scale 1:100000 topographic map. Sofia: Antarctic Place-names Commission of Bulgaria, 2005.
- L.L. Ivanov. Antarctica: Livingston Island and Greenwich, Robert, Snow and Smith Islands. Scale 1:120000 topographic map. Troyan: Manfred Wörner Foundation, 2009. ISBN 978-954-92032-6-4
- Antarctic Digital Database (ADD). Scale 1:250000 topographic map of Antarctica. Scientific Committee on Antarctic Research (SCAR). Since 1993, regularly upgraded and updated.
- L.L. Ivanov. Antarctica: Livingston Island and Smith Island. Scale 1:100000 topographic map. Manfred Wörner Foundation, 2017. ISBN 978-619-90008-3-0
- A. Kamburov and L. Ivanov. Bowles Ridge and Central Tangra Mountains: Livingston Island, Antarctica. Scale 1:25000 map. Sofia: Manfred Wörner Foundation, 2023. ISBN 978-619-90008-6-1
