= Shipka Saddle =

In the Tangra Mountains, Livingston Island, Antarctica

Location of Tangra Mountains on Livingston Island in the South Shetland Islands.

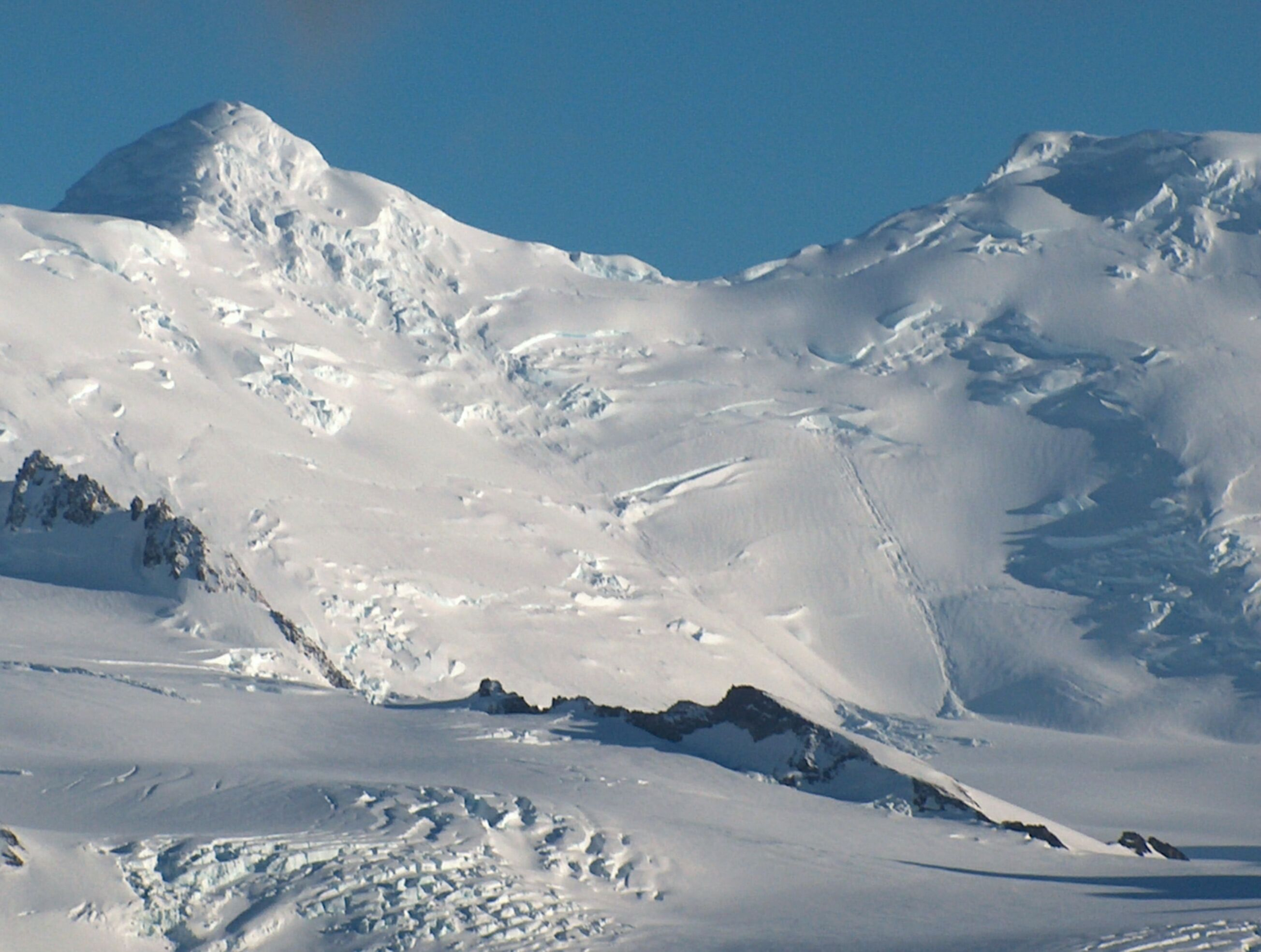
Shipka Saddle from Bransfield Strait, with Lyaskovets Peak to the left, Levski Peak to the right and Ludogorie Peak in the foreground.

Topographic map of Livingston Island and Smith Island.

Shipka Saddle (Shipchenska Sedlovina \'ship-chen-ska se-dlo-vi-'na\) is a deep ice-covered saddle in Tangra Mountains, Livingston Island, Antarctica between Friesland Ridge to the west and Levski Ridge to the east. The feature is 250 m long, with an elevation ca. 1,200 m. It forms part of the divide between the glacial catchments of Huron Glacier to the north and Macy Glacier to the south.

Shipka is the name of a pass in the Stara Planina (Balkan Mountains) in central Bulgaria.

== Location ==
The saddle midpoint is located at 62°39′50.3″S 60°07′46″W, which is 2.99 km east of Mount Friesland, 3.52 km south-southeast of Kuzman Knoll, 3.91 km west of Great Needle Peak and 3.95 km north of Peshev Peak (UK Directorate of Overseas Surveys mapping in 1968; rough Argentine mapping in 1980, and Bulgarian mapping in 2005 and 2009. Co-ordinates, elevation and distances given according to a 1995-96 Bulgarian topographic survey and the Tangra 2004/05 survey.

== Maps ==
- L.L. Ivanov et al. Antarctica: Livingston Island and Greenwich Island, South Shetland Islands. Scale 1:100000 topographic map. Sofia: Antarctic Place-names Commission of Bulgaria, 2005.
- L.L. Ivanov. Antarctica: Livingston Island and Greenwich, Robert, Snow and Smith Islands. Scale 1:120000 topographic map. Troyan: Manfred Wörner Foundation, 2009. ISBN 978-954-92032-6-4
- A. Kamburov and L. Ivanov. Bowles Ridge and Central Tangra Mountains: Livingston Island, Antarctica. Scale 1:25000 map. Sofia: Manfred Wörner Foundation, 2023. ISBN 978-619-90008-6-1
