= Shipka Valley =

Valley in the South Shetland Islands

Location of Tangra Mountains on Livingston Island in the South Shetland Islands.

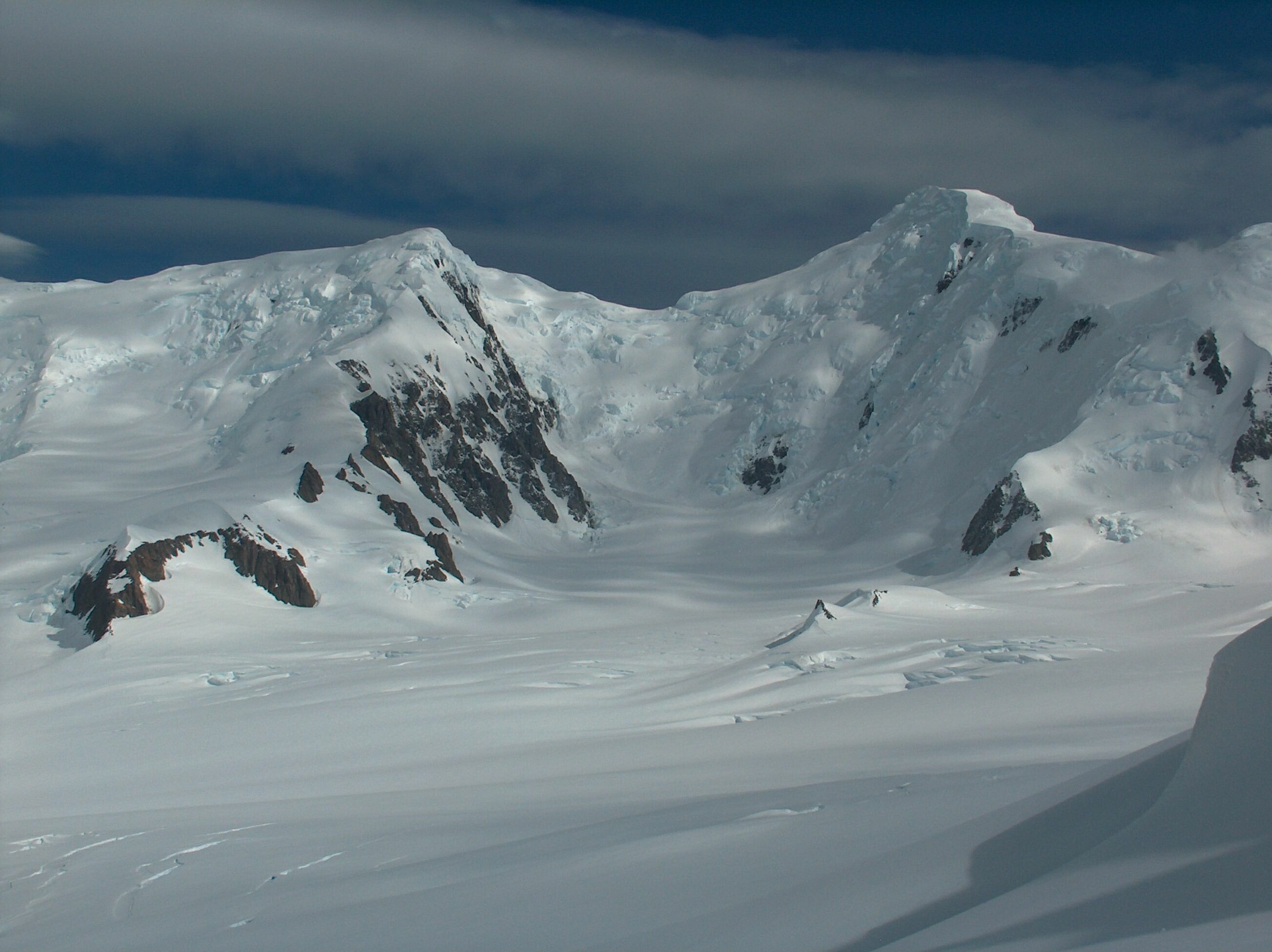
Shipka Valley from Pirdop Gate, with Levski Peak to the left and Lyaskovets Peak to the right.

Topographic map of Livingston Island, Greenwich, Robert, Snow and Smith Islands.

Shipka Valley (Shipchenska Dolina \'ship-chen-ska do-li-'na\) valley extending 2.4 km (1.5 mi) and 700 m (2,300 ft) wide in Tangra Mountains, Livingston Island in the South Shetland Islands, Antarctica. The valley descends from Shipka Saddle between the north slopes of Lyaskovets Peak and Levski Peak, and holds a tributary glacier which joins Huron Glacier east of Aheloy Nunatak.

It was first crossed by the Bulgarian Lyubomir Ivanov from Camp Academia on 17 December 2004, and takes its name from the adjacent Shipka Saddle.

== Location ==
The valley is centred at 62°39′05″S 60°08′00″W (Bulgarian mapping in 2005 and 2009 from the Tangra 2004/05 topographic survey).

== Maps ==
- L.L. Ivanov et al. Antarctica: Livingston Island and Greenwich Island, South Shetland Islands. Scale 1:100000 topographic map. Sofia: Antarctic Place-names Commission of Bulgaria, 2005.
- L.L. Ivanov. Antarctica: Livingston Island and Greenwich, Robert, Snow and Smith Islands. Scale 1:120000 topographic map. Troyan: Manfred Wörner Foundation, 2009. ISBN 978-954-92032-6-4
- A. Kamburov and L. Ivanov. Bowles Ridge and Central Tangra Mountains: Livingston Island, Antarctica. Scale 1:25000 map. Sofia: Manfred Wörner Foundation, 2023. ISBN 978-619-90008-6-1
