= Camp Academia =

- Antarctic camp
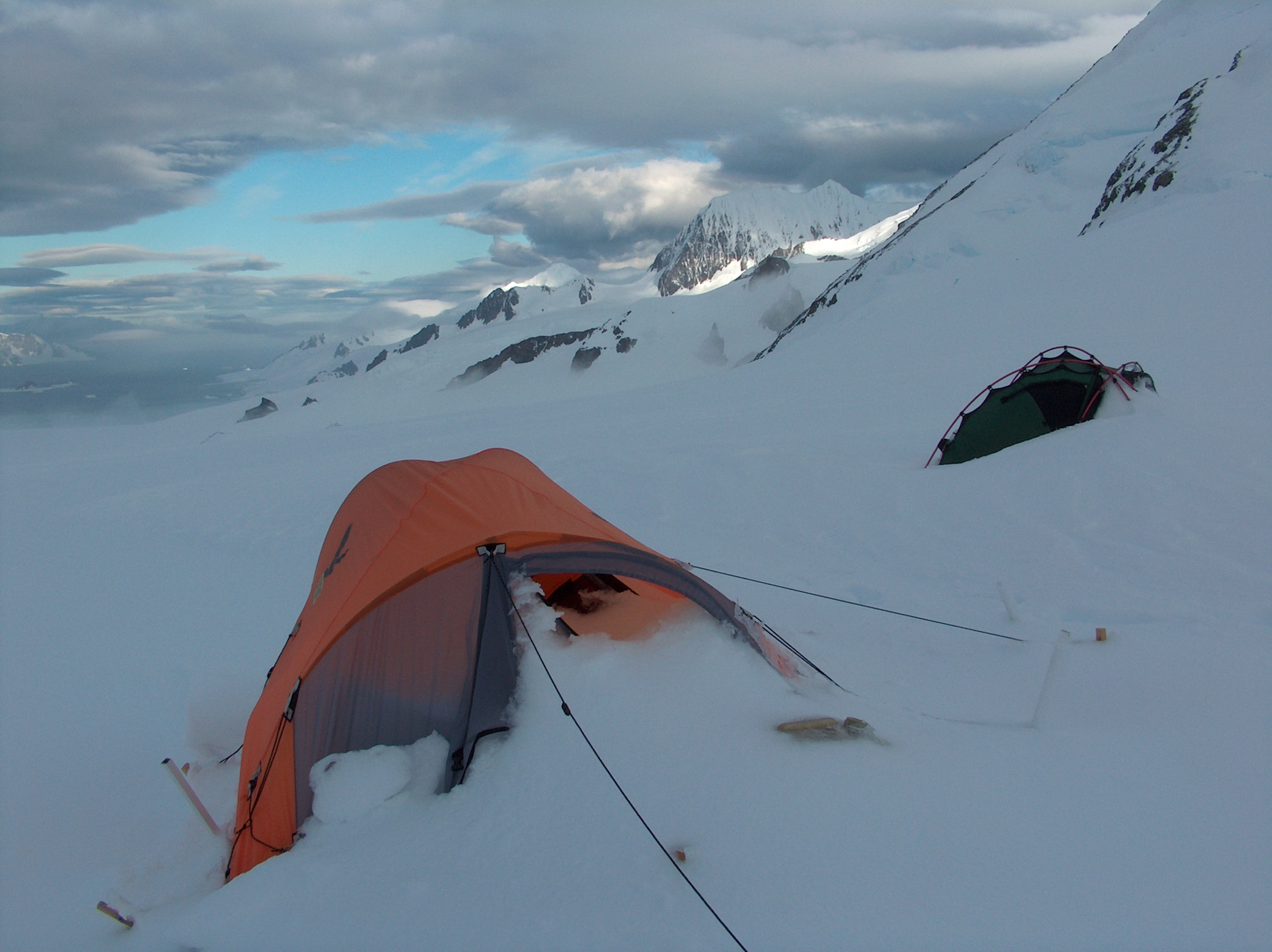
- Camp Academia under snow

- Location of Camp Academia in Antarctica
- Coordinates: 62°38′42″S 60°10′18″W
- Country: Bulgaria
- Location in Antarctica: Livingston Island; South Shetland Islands; Antarctica
- Administered by: Bulgarian Academy of Sciences
- Established: 3 December 2004
- Type: Seasonal
- Period: Summer
- Status: Operational

Camp Academia (Bulgarian: лагер Академия, romanized: lager Akademiya, IPA: [ˈɫaɡɛr ɐkɐˈdɛmijɐ]) is a geographical locality in eastern Livingston Island, South Shetland Islands, Antarctica, named for the Bulgarian Academy of Sciences in appreciation of the Academy’s contribution to Antarctic exploration. The site was first occupied in the 2004/05 austral summer, and has been designated since 2004 as the summer post office Tangra 1091, the southernmost branch of the Bulgarian Posts Plc.

== Access and survey routes ==
Camp Academia is strategically situated in upper Huron Glacier, Wörner Gap area, at elevation 541 m in the northwestern foothills of Zograf Peak, central Tangra Mountains. The site is accessible by 11-12.5 km routes from the Bulgarian base St. Kliment Ohridski and the Spanish base Juan Carlos I respectively.

Camp Academia offers convenient overland access to the main range of Tangra Mountains to the south (with survey and climbing routes leading from Camp Academia to Lyaskovets Peak and Mount Friesland via Catalunyan Saddle, and to Levski Peak, Great Needle Peak and Helmet Peak areas via Lozen Saddle); to Bowles Ridge, Vidin Heights, Kaliakra Glacier and Saedinenie Snowfield areas to the north; to Huron Glacier to the east; and to Pliska Ridge, Burdick Ridge, Perunika Glacier and Huntress Glacier to the west.

== Tangra 2004/05 Survey ==
Camp Academia hosted the base camp of the Bulgarian topographic survey Tangra 2004/05 from 3 December 2004 until 2 January 2005. The survey was both shipborne from the ships Vanguardia and Akademik Vavilov, and onshore at Livingston Island and Half Moon Island, and was carried out from 25 November 2004 until 11 January 2005 by the two-member team of Lyubomir Ivanov and Doychin Vasilev who covered either on ski or on foot an overall distance of some 200 km, mostly in harsh weather conditions and challenging unfamiliar terrain in Tangra Mountains, Bowles Ridge, Vidin Heights and the glaciers Huron, Kaliakra and Perunika.

First ascents were made of the peaks of Lyaskovets (1473 m), Ongal (1149 m), Zograf (1011 m), Komini (774 m), Melnik (696 m), Miziya (604 m), and several lesser peaks, as well as the third ascent of the summit Mount Friesland (1700 m). Extensive geodetic and geographic information was gathered, including coordinates and elevation data, actual sea shoreline and ice-free zones configuration, as well as a detailed photographic documentation of previously unexplored and remote areas in the interior of Livingston Island and Greenwich Island.

Based on the survey, some 150 geographical features were mapped for the first time and a new 1:100000 topographic map of the two islands was published in 2005. Data from the topographic survey Tangra 2004/05 was used also in the 2008 Bulgarian map of Livingston, Greenwich, Robert, Snow, and Smith Islands.

Field work carried out from Camp Academia during the Tangra 2004/05 survey has been noted by Discovery Channel, the Natural History Museum, the Royal Collection and the British Antarctic Survey as a timeline event in Antarctic exploration.

== Subsequent occupation ==
Camp Academia hosted the base camps for the first ascent of Great Needle Peak (1,679.5 m or 5,510 ft) by the Bulgarians Doychin Boyanov, Nikolay Petkov and Aleksander Shopov on 8 January 2015, and the first ascent of St. Boris Peak by Boyanov and Petkov on 22 December 2016.

== Tangra 1091 Post Office ==
The post office Antarctica Tangra 1091 of Bulgarian Posts Plc operated during the entire duration of the expedition Tangra 2004/05 in Antarctica from 25 November 2004 until 11 January 2005, in Camp Academia from 3 December 2004 until 2 January 2005. The office was given the postcode 1091, and was run by Postmaster Lyubomir Ivanov in compliance with standard Bulgarian postal regulations and procedures.

The mailing address of the office was: Camp Academia; 1091 Tangra; Livingston Island; Antarctica. The mail (i.e. its postage stamps) was cancelled by a standard circular Bulgarian handstamping cancellation seal (metal issue) with an inscription “POSTE BULGARE ANTARKTIKA TANGRA 1091” on its periphery and date/hour counter in the centre. Other occasional cachets applied on Tangra 1091 mail often included the triangular cachet of Camp Academia with an inscription “ANTARCTIC EXPEDITION TANGRA 2004 CAMP ACADEMIA” and/or other personal, station and ship postmarks.

A total of 517 outgoing mail consignments (letters and postcards) were shipped, 364 of them via Sofia, 150 via Punta Arenas, and 3 via the St. Kliment Ohridski post office. These were distributed geographically between 30 country destinations as follows: Bulgaria – 146, Germany – 144, Belgium – 54, Chile – 50, Britain – 18, U.S.A. – 15, Spain – 13, New Zealand – 11, France – 9, Argentina – 7, Australia – 7, Austria – 7, Switzerland – 7, Falkland Islands – 5, Antarctica (Livingston Island) – 3, Afghanistan – 2, Czech Republic – 2, Italy – 2, Japan – 2, Portugal – 2, Uruguay – 2, Denmark – 1, Greece – 1, Indonesia – 1, Iraq – 1, Montserrat – 1, Slovakia – 1, Slovenia – 1, South Africa – 1, Vanuatu – 1.

== Location ==
Camp Academia is situated at 62°38′41.9″S 60°10′18.3″W, which is 3.6 km east of Orpheus Gate, 5.25 km east-southeast of Rezen Saddle, 3.2 km south-southeast of Omurtag Pass, 4 km southwest of Pirdop Gate, 1.68 km west of Lozen Saddle, 7.1 km west of Karnobat Pass, and 2.68 km north-northwest of Catalunyan Saddle.

== See also ==
- Tangra Mountains
- St. Kliment Ohridski Base
- Livingston Island
- Antarctic Place-names Commission
- Tangra 2004/05
- List of Antarctic research stations
- List of Antarctic field camps

== Gallery ==
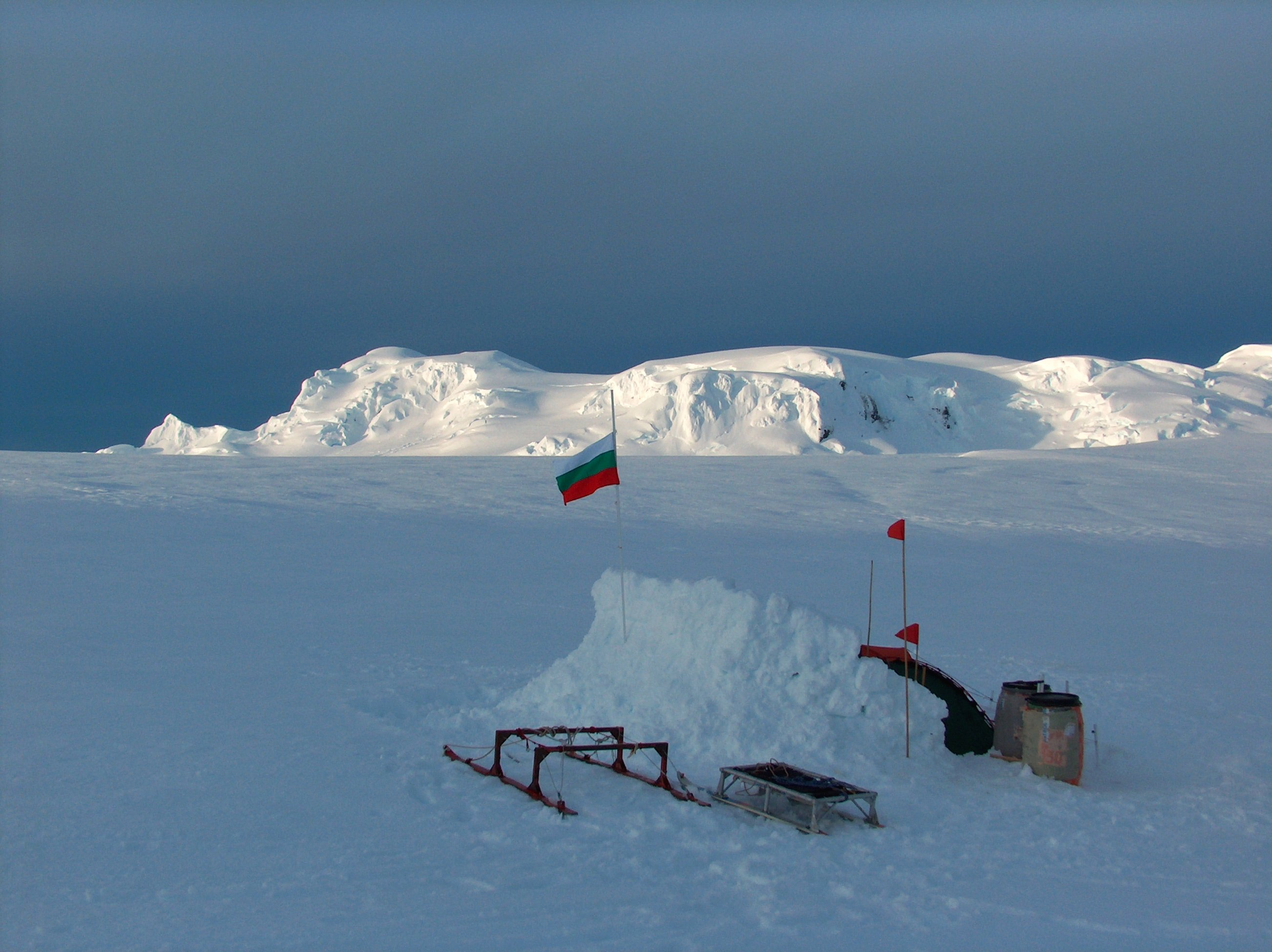
Camp Academia with Wörner Gap and Bowles Ridge

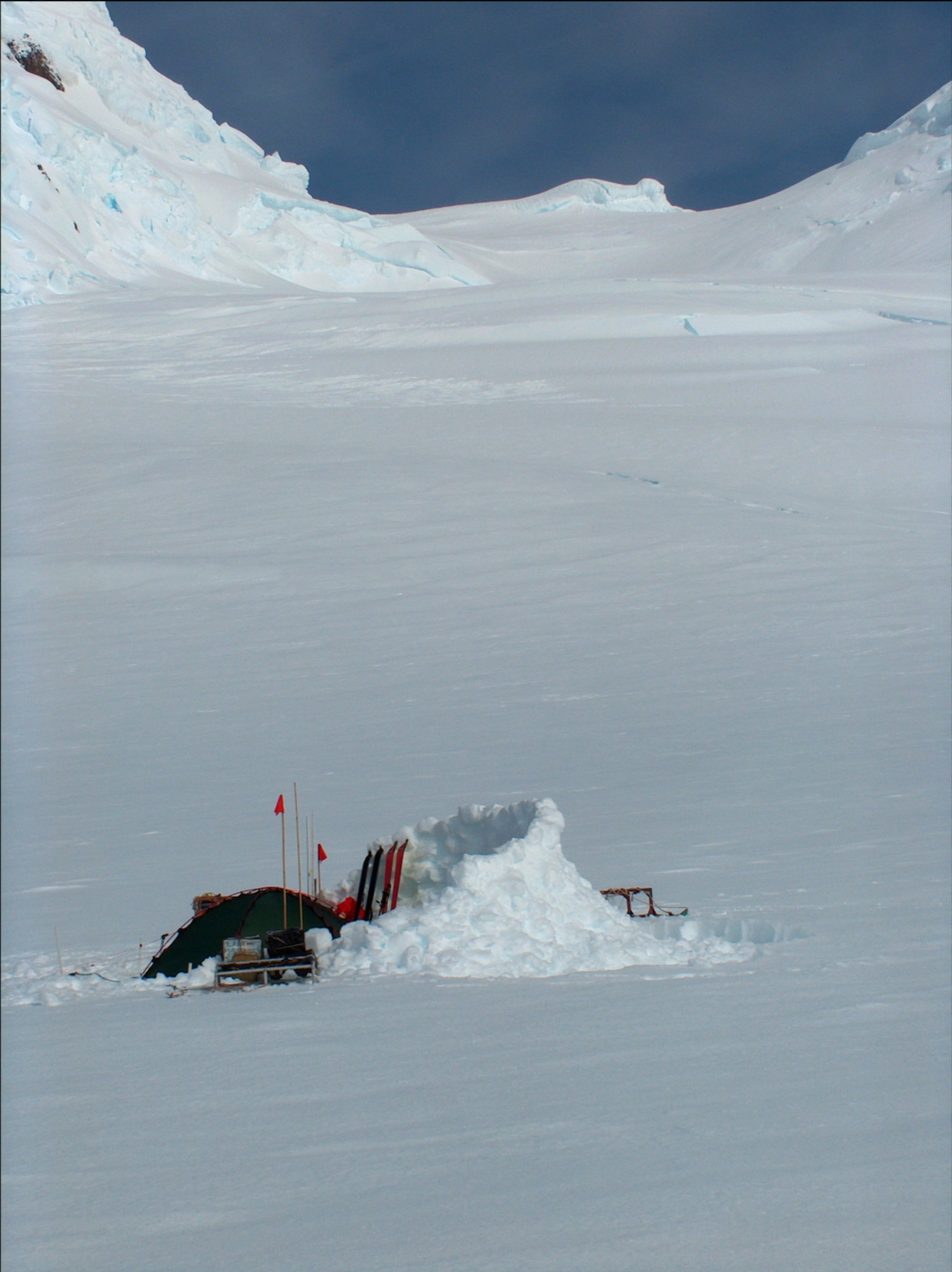
Camp Academia with Catalunyan Saddle

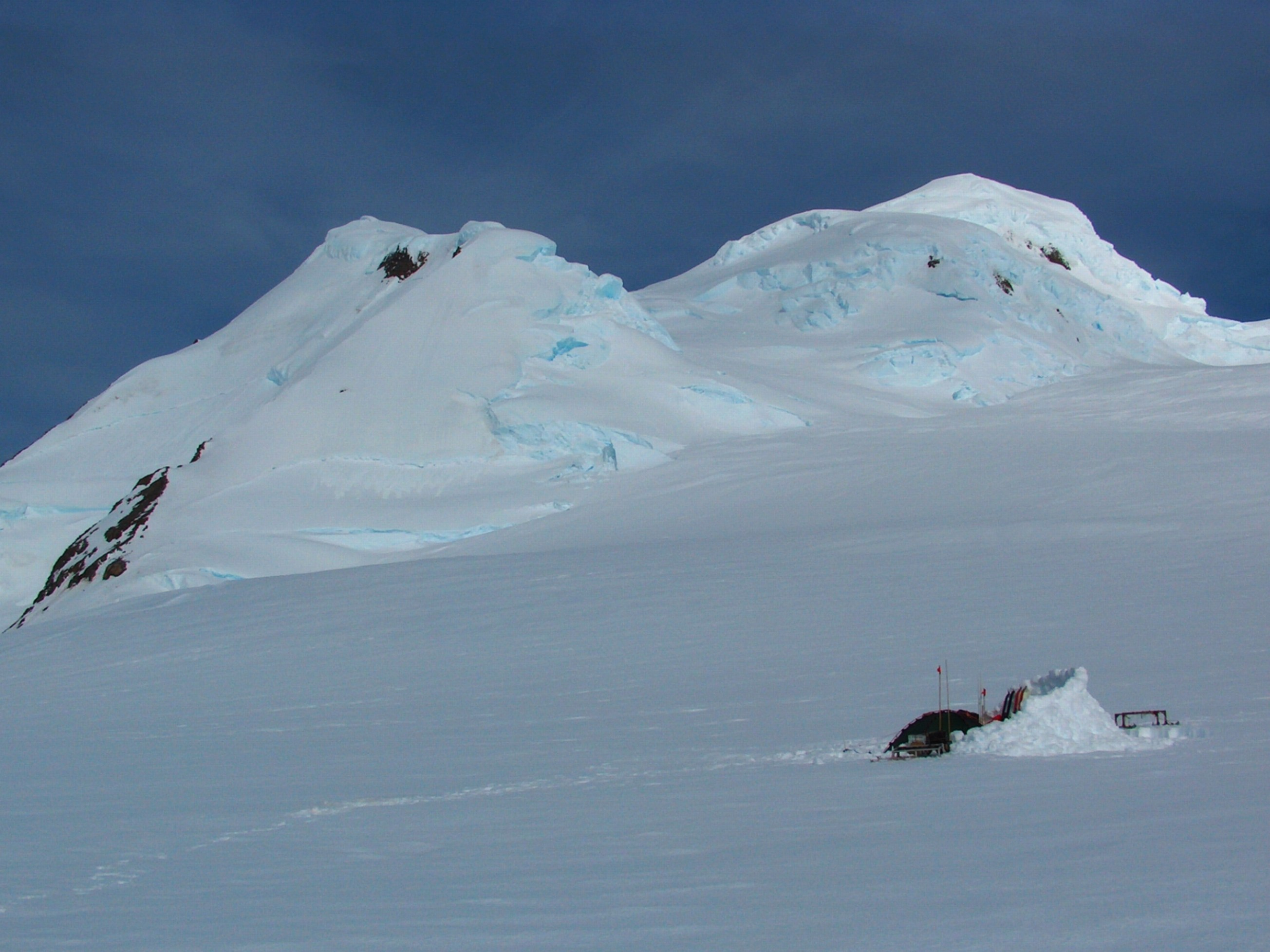
Camp Academia with Zograf Peak and Lyaskovets Peak

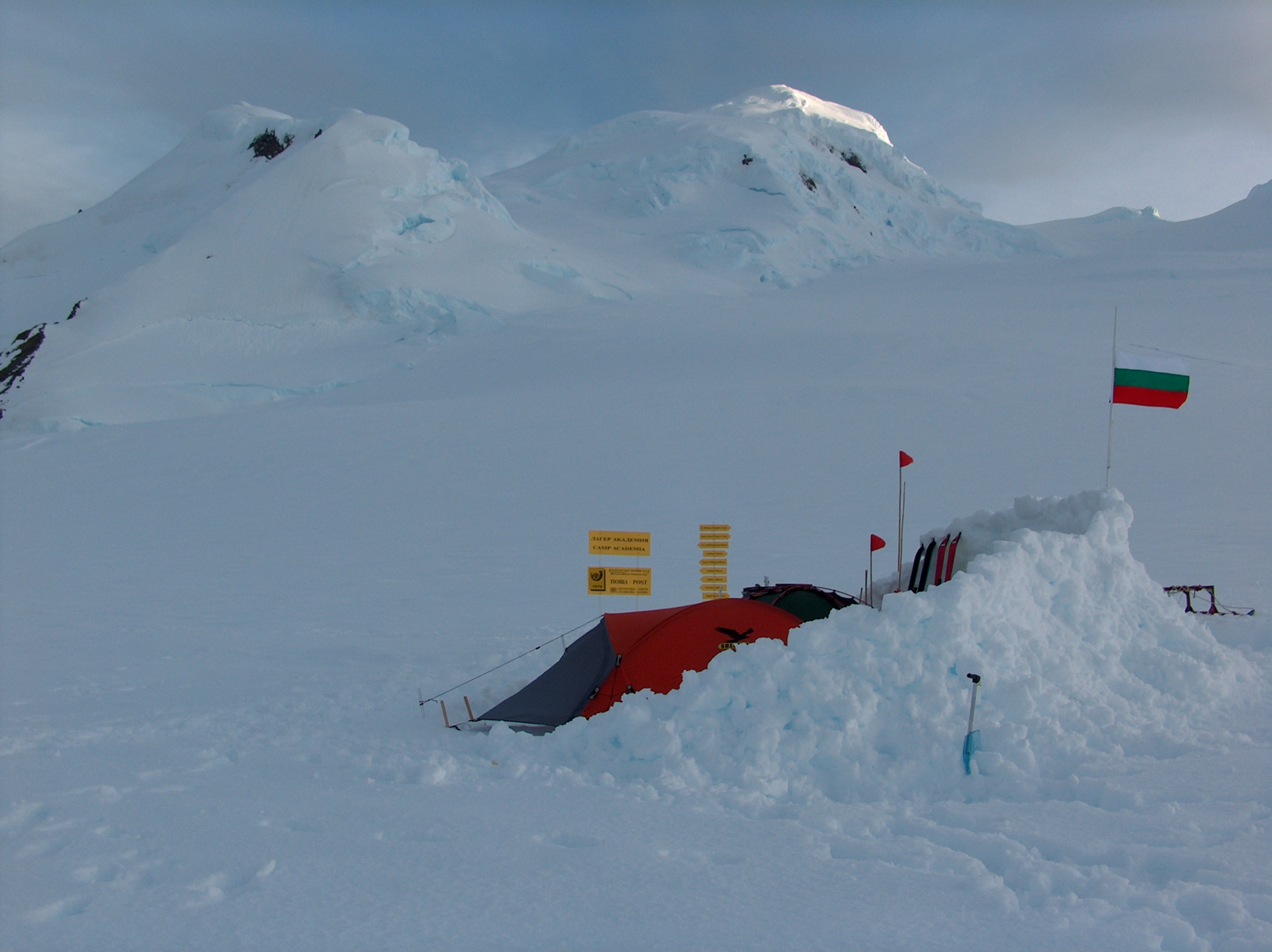
Camp Academia with Zograf Peak, Lyaskovets Peak and Catalunyan Saddle

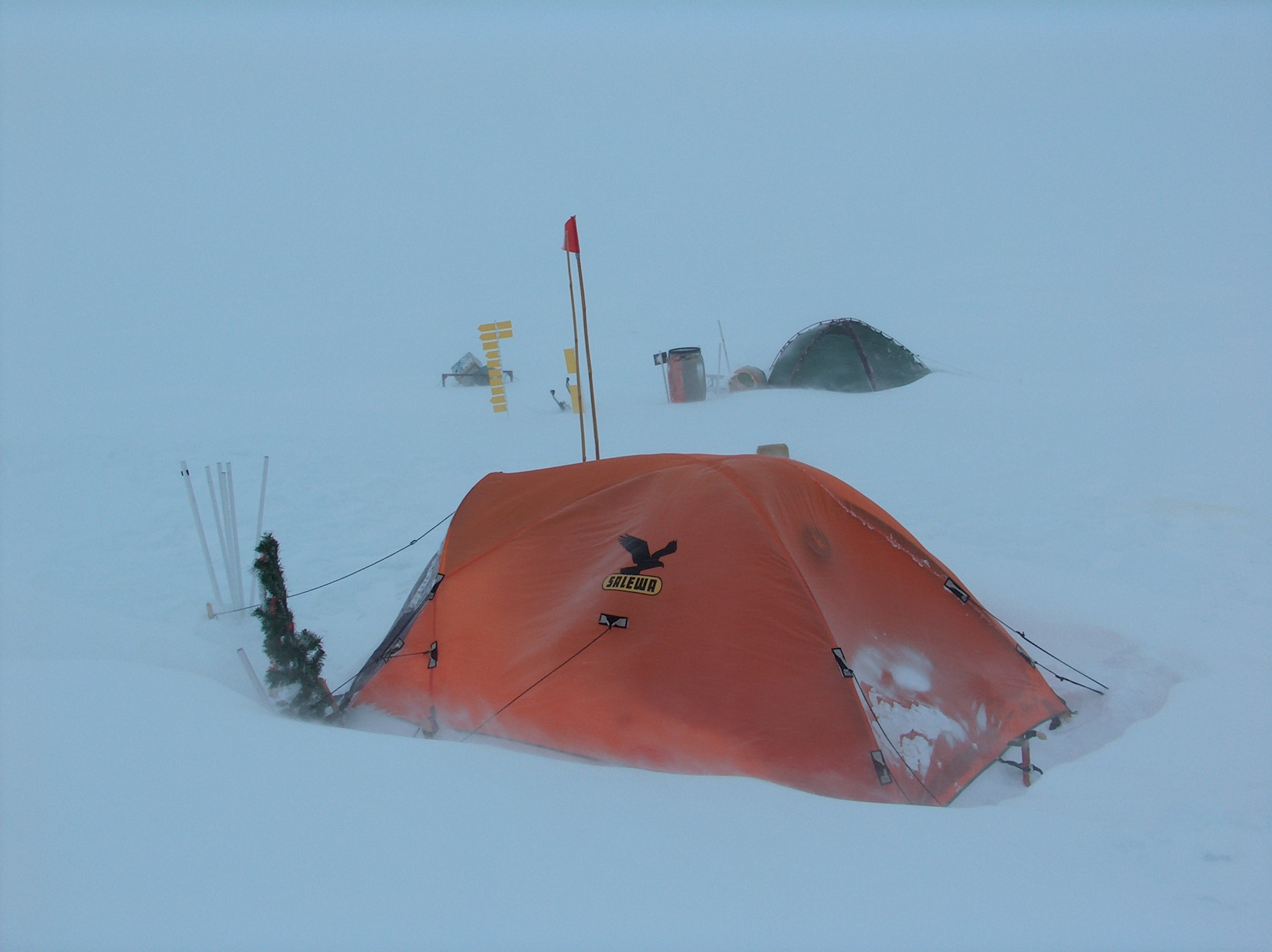
Camp Academia on New Year's Eve

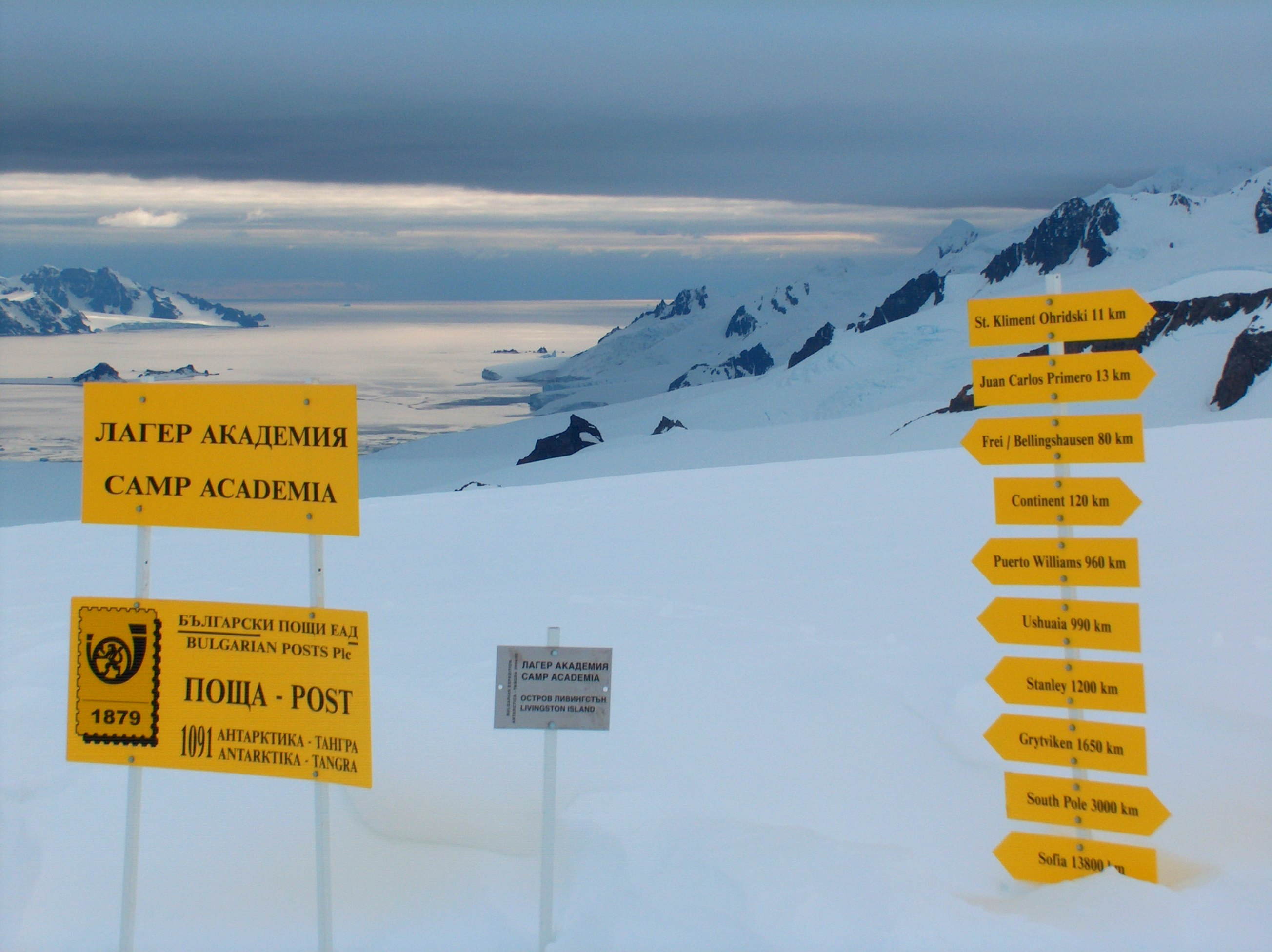
Post office Tangra 1091

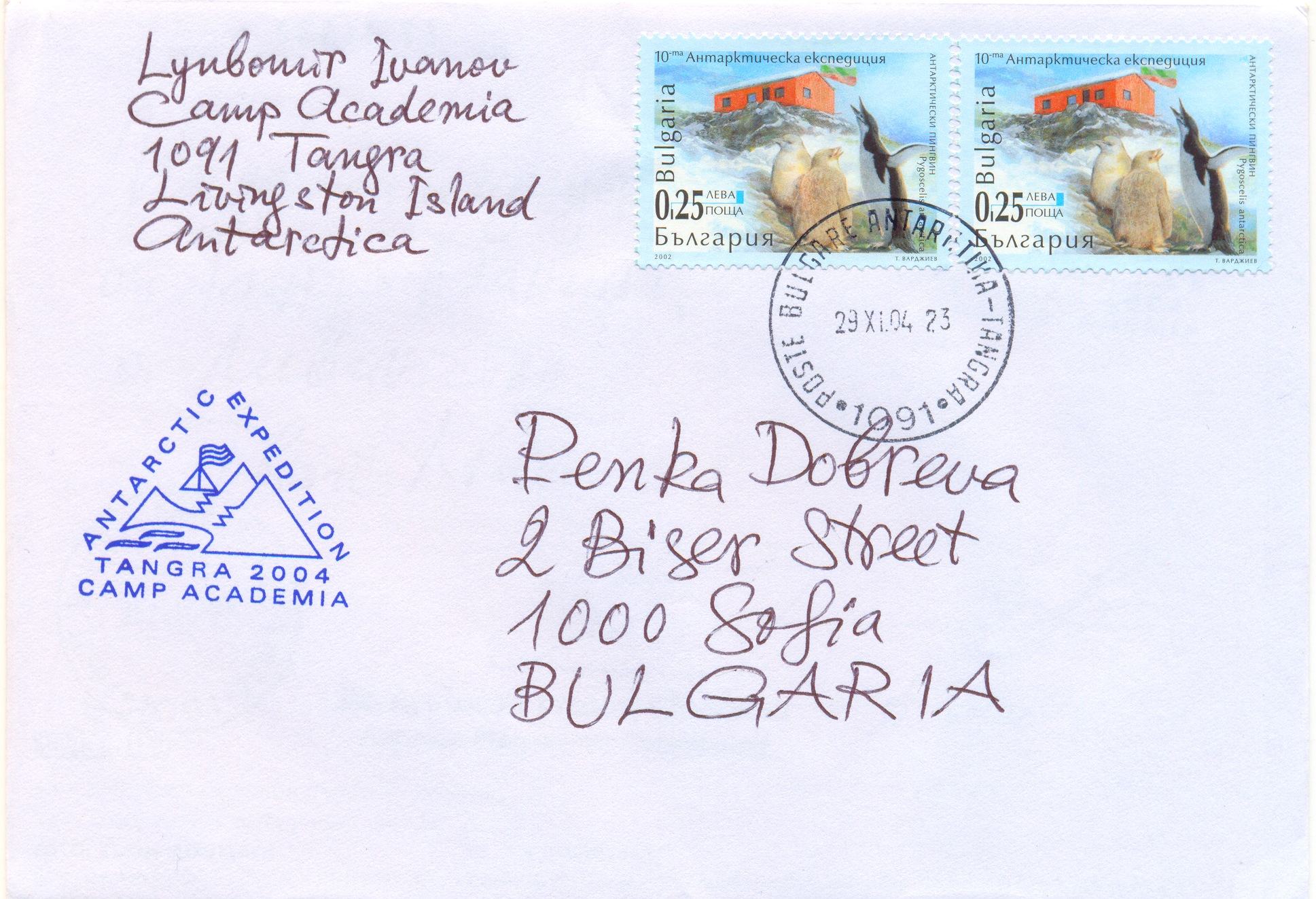
A letter from Camp Academia

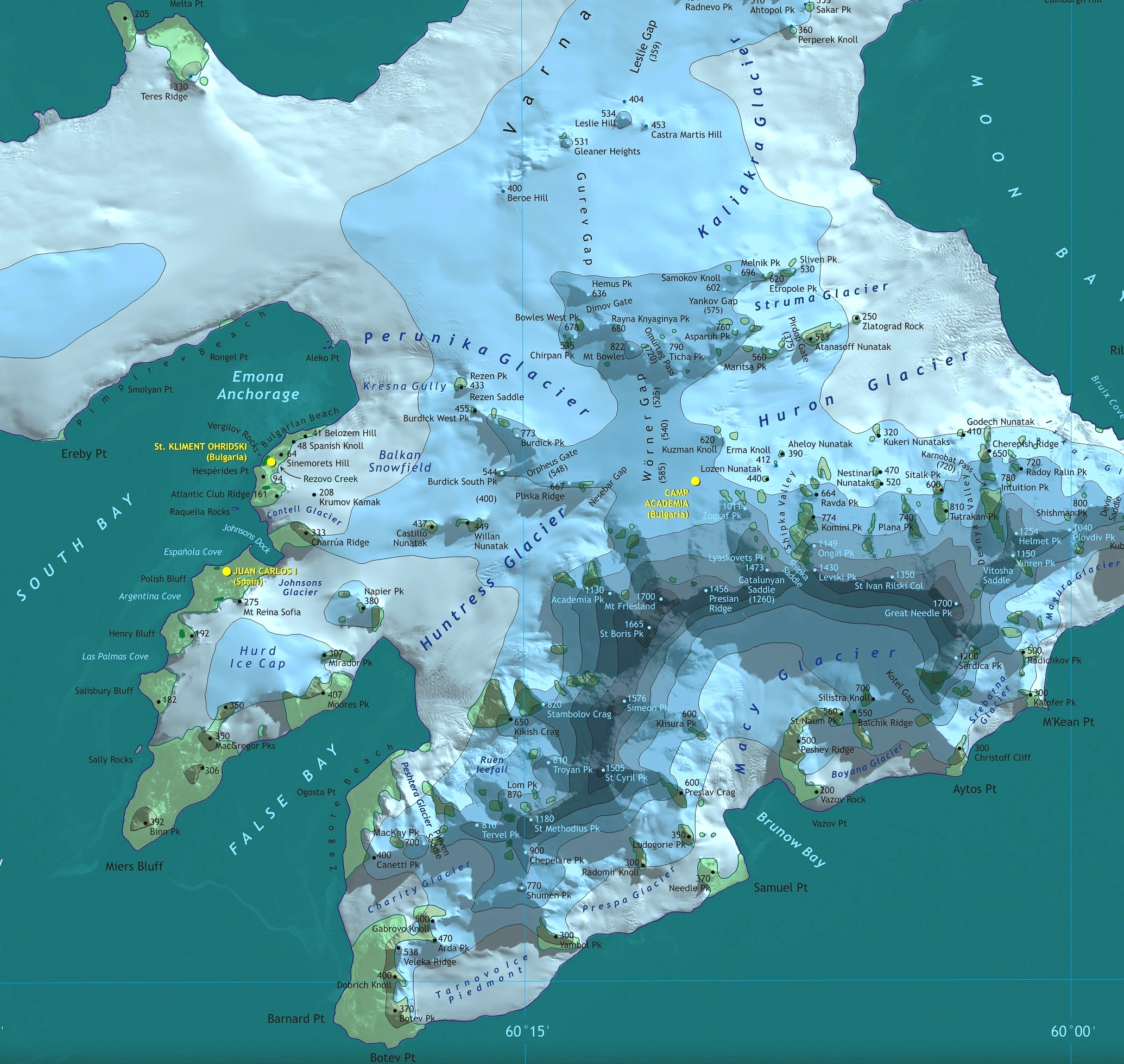
Camp Academia on a 2005 map of Livingston Island

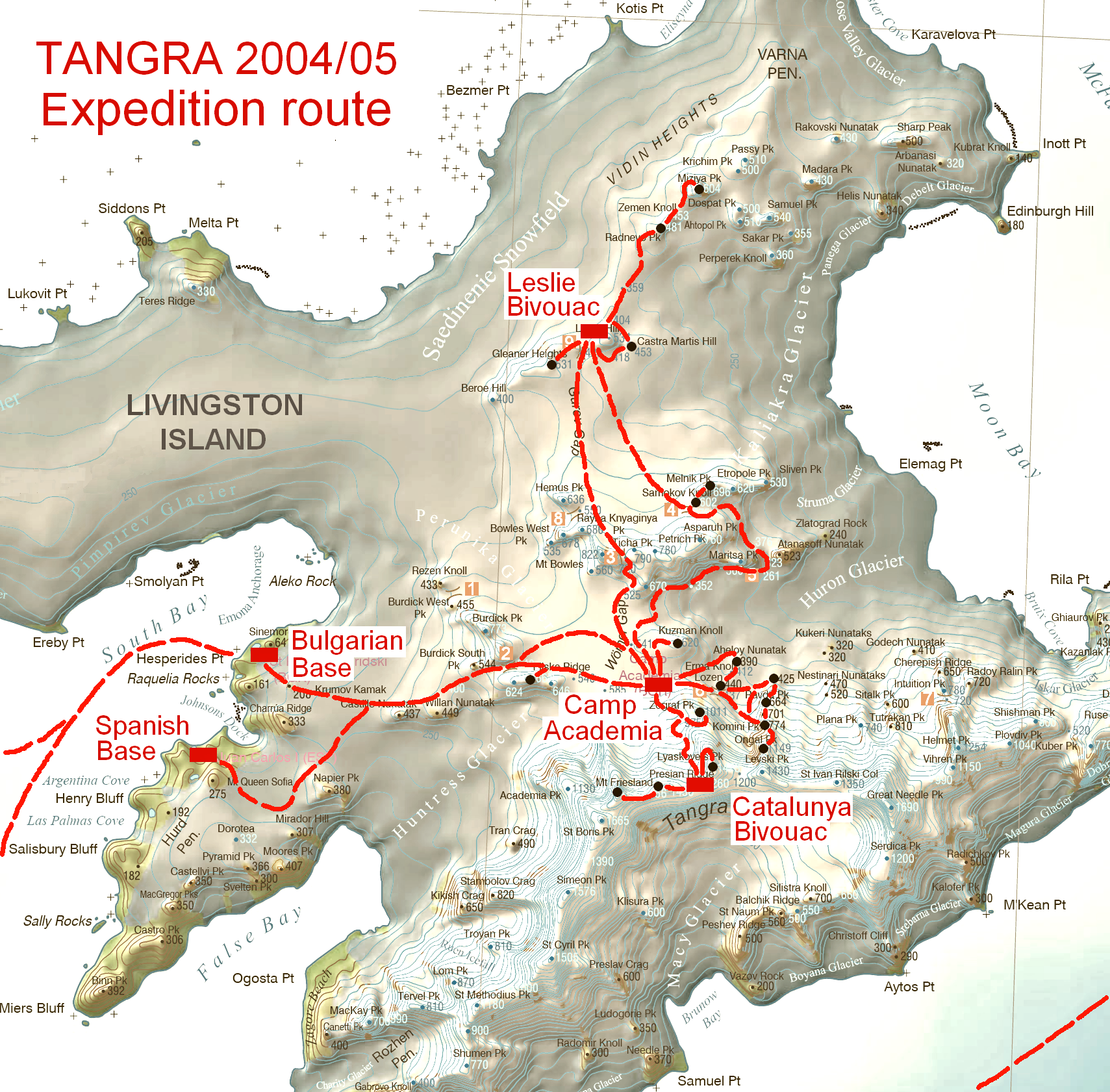
The central-eastern region of Livingston Island with Camp Academia and the expedition route of the Tangra 2004/05 Survey

Topographic map of Livingston Island with the bases and base camps on the island

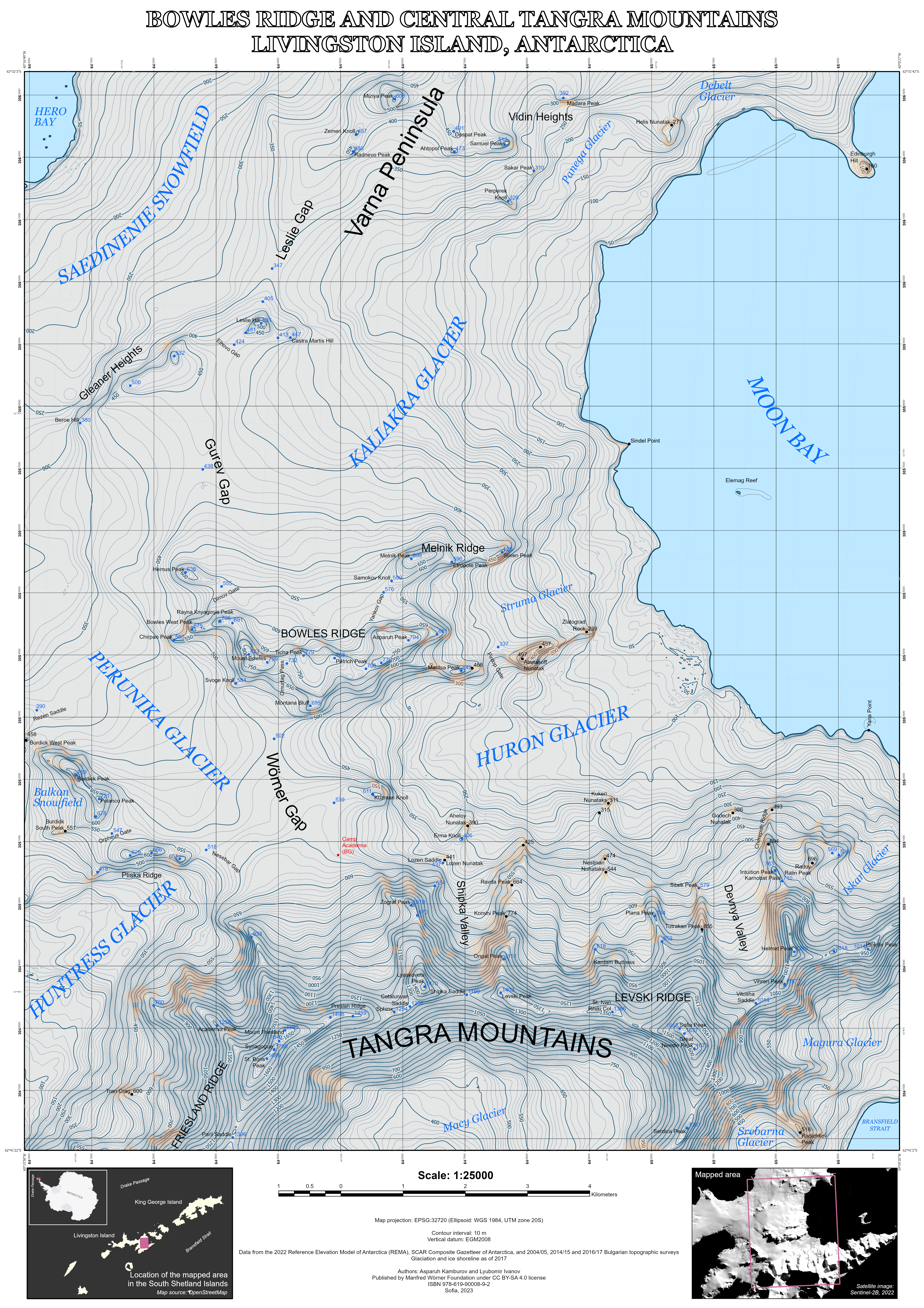
Topographic map of Bowles Ridge and central Tangra Mountains featuring Camp Academia

== Maps ==
- L. Ivanov, N. Glavinchev, R. Tosheva and S. Naydenov. Antarctica: Livingston Island and Greenwich Island, South Shetland Islands (from English Strait to Morton Strait, with illustrations and ice-cover distribution). Scale 1:100000 topographic map. Sofia: Antarctic Place-names Commission of Bulgaria, 2005.
- L.L. Ivanov. Antarctica: Livingston Island and Greenwich, Robert, Snow and Smith Islands. Scale 1:120000 topographic map. Troyan: Manfred Wörner Foundation, 2010. ISBN 978-954-92032-9-5 (First edition 2009. ISBN 978-954-92032-6-4)
- L.L. Ivanov. Antarctica: Livingston Island and Smith Island. Scale 1:100000 topographic map. Manfred Wörner Foundation, 2017. ISBN 978-619-90008-3-0
- Antarctic Digital Database (ADD). Scale 1:250000 topographic map of Antarctica. Scientific Committee on Antarctic Research (SCAR). Since 1993, regularly upgraded and updated.
- A. Kamburov and L. Ivanov. Bowles Ridge and Central Tangra Mountains: Livingston Island, Antarctica. Scale 1:25000 map. Sofia: Manfred Wörner Foundation, 2023. ISBN 978-619-90008-6-1

== Sources ==
- L.L. Ivanov, Livingston Island: Tangra Mountains, Komini Peak, west slope new rock route; Lyaskovets Peak, first ascent; Zograf Peak, first ascent; Vidin Heights, Melnik Peak, Melnik Ridge, first ascent, The American Alpine Journal, 2005, 312-315.
- Antarctica: Livingston Island, Climb Magazine, Issue 14, Kettering, UK, April 2006, 89-91.
- Ivanov, L.L. Bulgaria in Antarctica. South Shetland Islands. Livingston Island and Greenwich, Robert, Snow and Smith Islands. Sofia: Manfred Wörner Foundation, 2009. 16 pp., with a folded map. ISBN 978-954-92032-7-1
- Ivanov, L. and N. Ivanova. The World of Antarctica. Generis Publishing, 2022. 241 pp. ISBN 979-8-88676-403-1 (2014 Bulgarian edition of the book)
- Ivanov, L. General Geography and History of Livingston Island. In: Bulgarian Antarctic Research: A Synthesis. Eds. C. Pimpirev and N. Chipev. Sofia: St. Kliment Ohridski University Press, 2015. pp. 17–28. ISBN 978-954-07-3939-7
