= Shishman Peak =

Peak in the South Shetland Islands, Antarctica

Location of Tangra Mountains on Livingston Island in the South Shetland Islands.

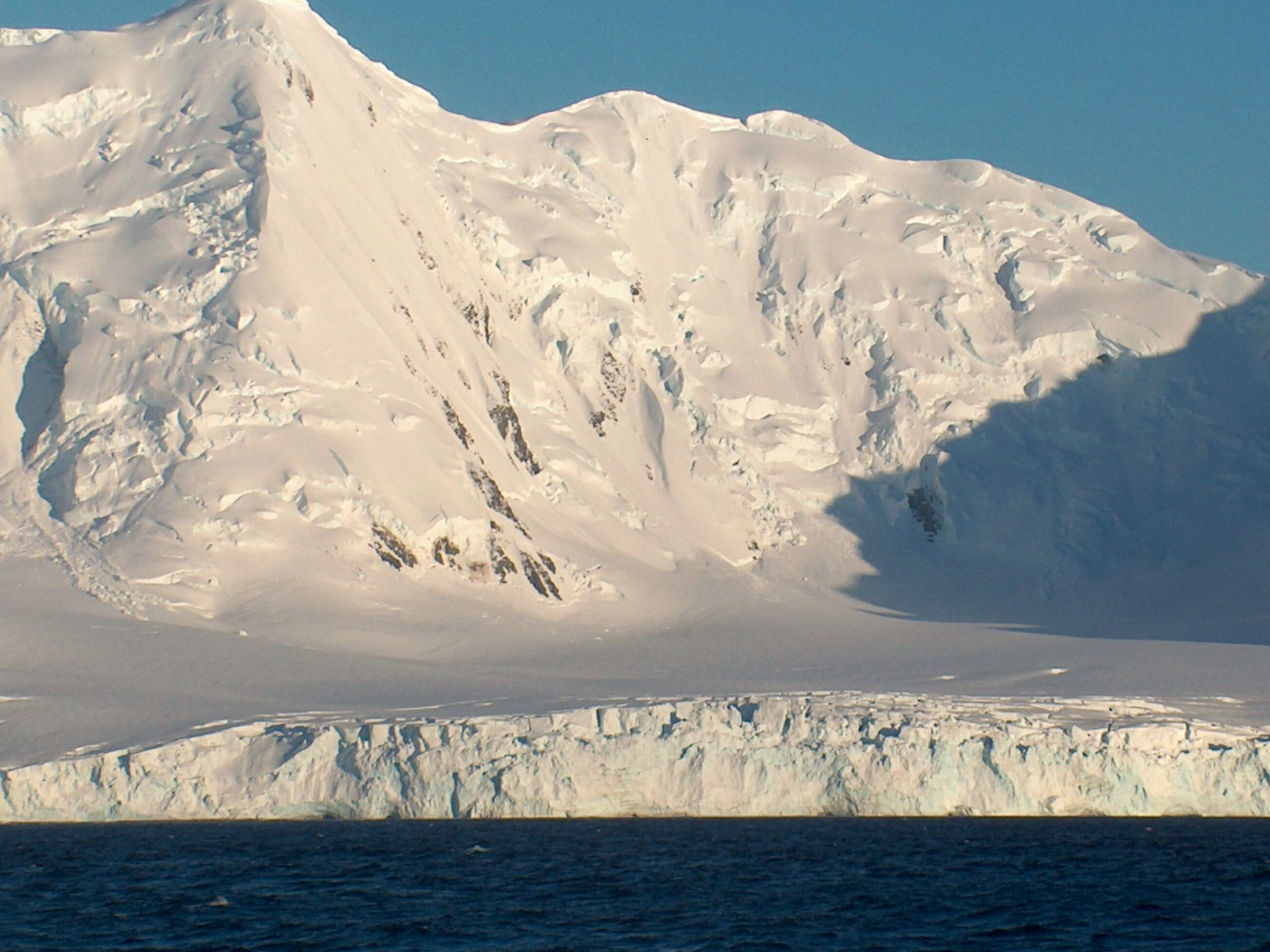
Shishman Peak from Bransfield Strait, with Magura Glacier in the foreground.

Topographic map of Livingston Island and Smith Island.

Shishman Peak (Bulgarian: връх Шишман, romanized: vrah Shishman, IPA: [ˈvrɤx ʃiʃˈman]) rises to over 800 m in the east extremity of Levski Ridge, Tangra Mountains, eastern Livingston Island in the South Shetland Islands, Antarctica. The peak overlooks Iskar Glacier and Bruix Cove to the north-northeast and Magura Glacier to the south. The peak is named after Czar Ivan Shishman of Bulgaria, 1371-1395 AD.

== Location ==
The peak is located at 62°38′59.5″S 59°59′28″W, which is west of Devin Saddle, 780 m northeast of Plovdiv Peak, 1.43 km west-northwest of Kuber Peak and 3.45 km south-southwest of Rila Point (Bulgarian mapping in 2005 and 2009).

== Maps ==
- South Shetland Islands. Scale 1:200000 topographic map No. 3373. DOS 610 – W 62 58. Tolworth, UK, 1968.
- Islas Livingston y Decepción. Mapa topográfico a escala 1:100000. Madrid: Servicio Geográfico del Ejército, 1991.
- S. Soccol, D. Gildea and J. Bath. Livingston Island, Antarctica. Scale 1:100000 satellite map. The Omega Foundation, USA, 2004.
- L.L. Ivanov et al., Antarctica: Livingston Island and Greenwich Island, South Shetland Islands (from English Strait to Morton Strait, with illustrations and ice-cover distribution), 1:100000 scale topographic map, Antarctic Place-names Commission of Bulgaria, Sofia, 2005
- L.L. Ivanov. Antarctica: Livingston Island and Greenwich, Robert, Snow and Smith Islands. Scale 1:120000 topographic map. Troyan: Manfred Wörner Foundation, 2010. ISBN 978-954-92032-9-5 (First edition 2009. ISBN 978-954-92032-6-4)
- Antarctic Digital Database (ADD). Scale 1:250000 topographic map of Antarctica. Scientific Committee on Antarctic Research (SCAR). Since 1993, regularly updated.
- L.L. Ivanov. Antarctica: Livingston Island and Smith Island. Scale 1:100000 topographic map. Manfred Wörner Foundation, 2017. ISBN 978-619-90008-3-0
