= Kuber Peak =

Mountain in the Antarctic

Location of Tangra Mountains on Livingston Island in the South Shetland Islands

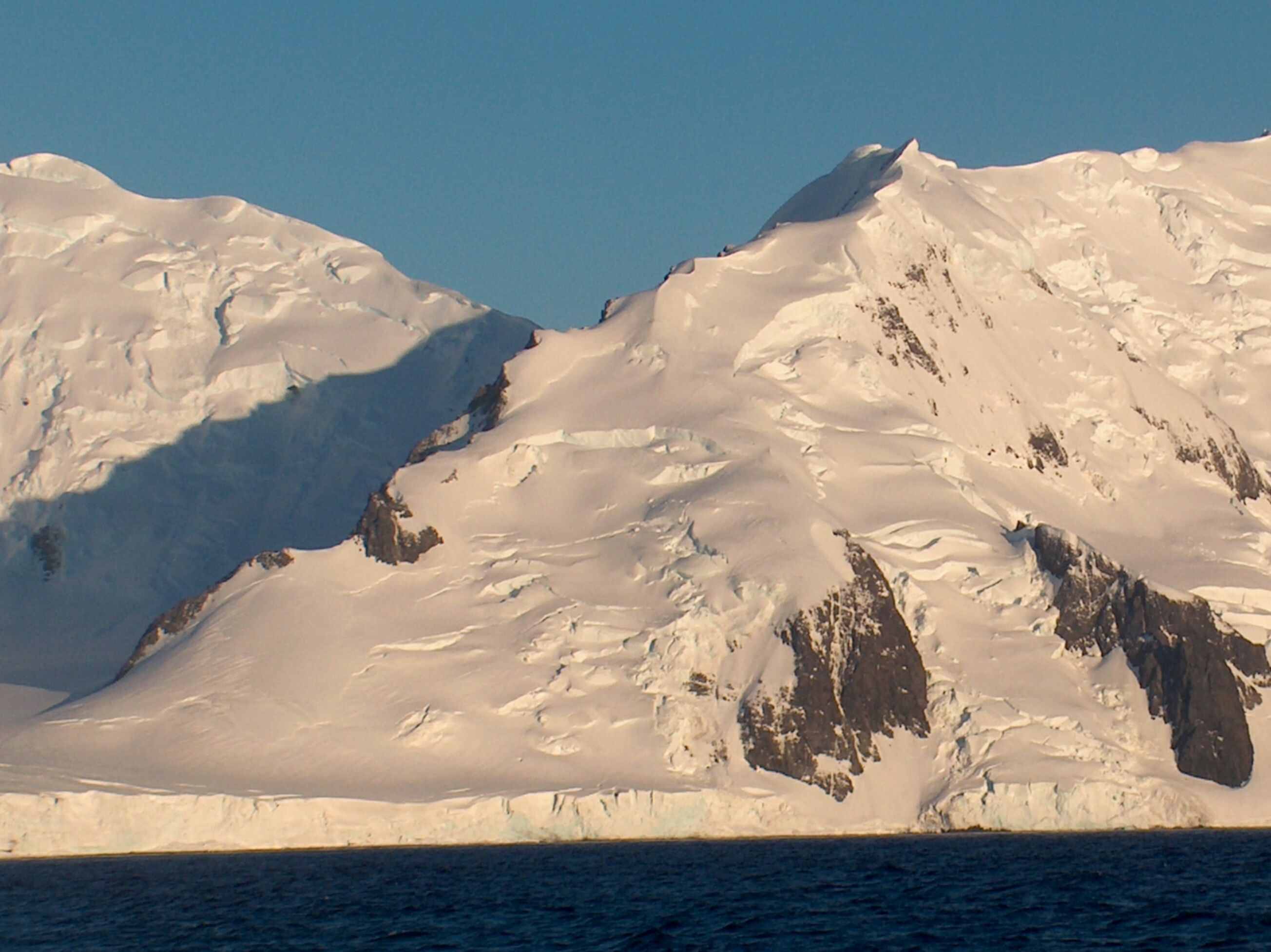
Kuber Peak from Bransfield Strait

Topographic map of Livingston Island and Smith Island

Kuber Peak (Bulgarian: връх Кубер, romanized: vrah Kuber, IPA: [ˈvrɤx ˈkubɛr]) is a 770 m peak in Delchev Ridge, Tangra Mountains on Livingston Island in the South Shetland Islands, Antarctica. Overlooking Magura Glacier to the southwest, Dobrudzha Glacier to the southeast, and Iskar Glacier to the north.

Named after Khan Kuber whose Bulgars left Pannonia to settle in Western Macedonia and Albania around 680 AD, and established a state that in the early 8th century AD merged with the First Bulgarian Empire.

== Location ==
The peak is located at 62°39′16″S 59°57′54″W which is 770 m southwest of Ruse Peak, 2.2 km southwest of Delchev Peak, 3.84 km south of Rila Point, 3.08 km east of Helmet Peak, 1.92 km east of Plovdiv Peak, and 1.43 km east-southeast of Shishman Peak to which the peak is linked by Devin Saddle. (Bulgarian mapping in 2005 and 2009).

== Maps ==
- L.L. Ivanov et al., Antarctica: Livingston Island and Greenwich Island, South Shetland Islands (from English Strait to Morton Strait, with illustrations and ice-cover distribution), 1:100000 scale topographic map, Antarctic Place-names Commission of Bulgaria, Sofia, 2005.
- L.L. Ivanov. Antarctica: Livingston Island and Greenwich, Robert, Snow and Smith Islands. Scale 1:120000 topographic map. Troyan: Manfred Wörner Foundation, 2009. ISBN 978-954-92032-6-4
