= Plovdiv Peak =

Peak in South Shetland Islands, Antarctica

Location of Tangra Mountains on Livingston Island in the South Shetland Islands.

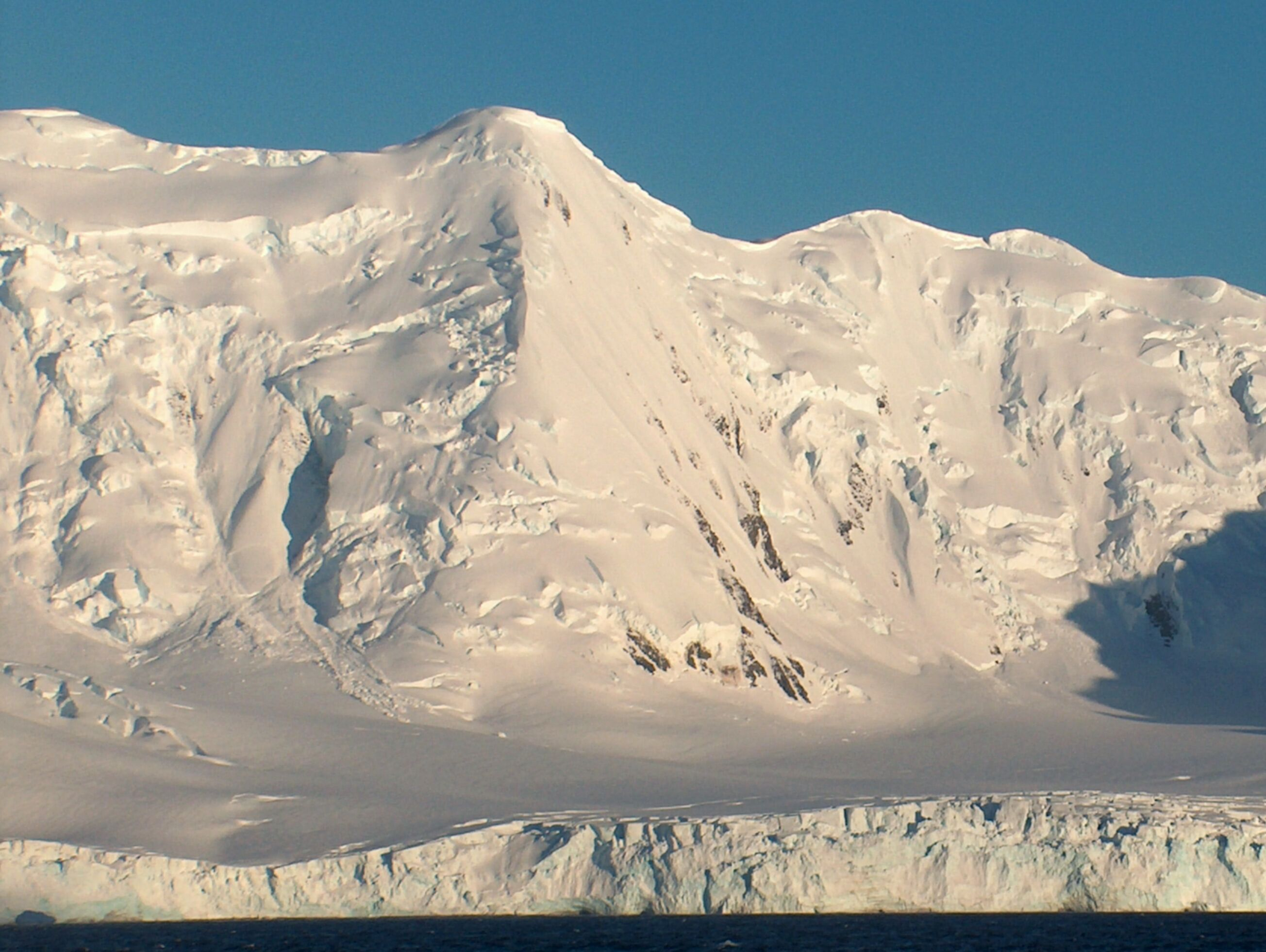
Plovdiv Peak from Bransfield Strait.

Topographic map of Livingston Island and Smith Island.

Plovdiv Peak (Bulgarian: връх Пловдив, romanized: vrah Plovdiv, IPA: [ˈvrɤx ˈpɫɔvdif]) is a peak rising to 1,040 m in the east extremity of Levski Ridge, Tangra Mountains, Livingston Island in the South Shetland Islands, Antarctica. The peak overlooks Magura Glacier to the south and Iskar Glacier to the north-northeast.

The peak was named after the Bulgarian city of Plovdiv.

== Location ==
The peak is located at 62°39′12″S 60°00′35″W, which is 3.15 km east-northeast of Great Needle Peak (Pico Falsa Aguja), 1.17 km east of Helmet Peak, 3.48 km south of Yana Point, 780 m southwest of Shishman Peak, 1.92 km west of Kuber Peak and 4.22 km north of M'Kean Point and (Bulgarian mapping in 2005 and 2009).

== Maps ==
- South Shetland Islands. Scale 1:200000 topographic map. DOS 610 Sheet W 62 60. Tolworth, UK, 1968.
- Islas Livingston y Decepción. Mapa topográfico a escala 1:100000. Madrid: Servicio Geográfico del Ejército, 1991.
- S. Soccol, D. Gildea and J. Bath. Livingston Island, Antarctica. Scale 1:100000 satellite map. The Omega Foundation, USA, 2004.
- L.L. Ivanov et al., Antarctica: Livingston Island and Greenwich Island, South Shetland Islands (from English Strait to Morton Strait, with illustrations and ice-cover distribution), 1:100000 scale topographic map, Antarctic Place-names Commission of Bulgaria, Sofia, 2005
- L.L. Ivanov. Antarctica: Livingston Island and Greenwich, Robert, Snow and Smith Islands. Scale 1:120000 topographic map. Troyan: Manfred Wörner Foundation, 2010. ISBN 978-954-92032-9-5 (First edition 2009. ISBN 978-954-92032-6-4)
- Antarctic Digital Database (ADD). Scale 1:250000 topographic map of Antarctica. Scientific Committee on Antarctic Research (SCAR), 1993–2016.
- A. Kamburov and L. Ivanov. Bowles Ridge and Central Tangra Mountains: Livingston Island, Antarctica. Scale 1:25000 map. Sofia: Manfred Wörner Foundation, 2023. ISBN 978-619-90008-6-1
