= Devnya Valley =

Valley in the South Shetland Islands

Location of Tangra Mountains on Livingston Island in the South Shetland Islands.

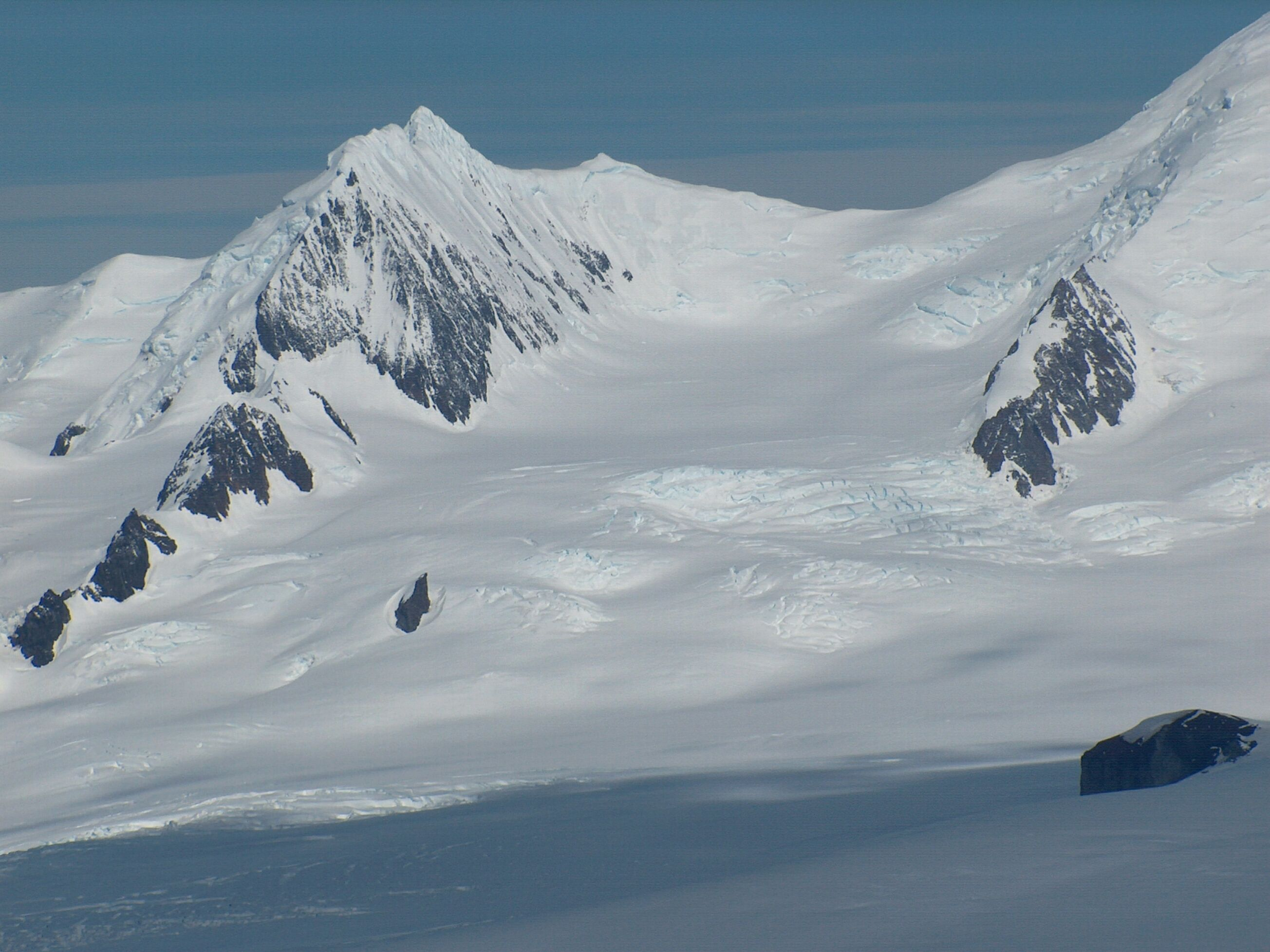
Devnya Valley

Topographic map of Livingston Island, Greenwich, Robert, Snow and Smith Islands.

Devnya Valley (Devnenska Dolina \'dev-nen-ska do-li-'na\) is 2.5-km long and 700 m wide valley and is situated between the north slopes of Great Needle Peak (Falsa Aguja Peak) and Helmet Peak in Levski Ridge, Tangra Mountains on Livingston Island in the South Shetland Islands. The valley holds a side tributary of Huron Glacier. It is named after the town of Devnya in Northeastern Bulgaria.

== Location ==
The valley is centred at 62°39′11″S 60°02′40″W (Bulgarian mapping in 2005 and 2009 from the Tangra 2004/05 topographic survey).

== Maps ==
- L.L. Ivanov et al. Antarctica: Livingston Island and Greenwich Island, South Shetland Islands. Scale 1:100000 topographic map. Sofia: Antarctic Place-names Commission of Bulgaria, 2005.
- L.L. Ivanov. Antarctica: Livingston Island and Greenwich, Robert, Snow and Smith Islands. Scale 1:120000 topographic map. Troyan: Manfred Wörner Foundation, 2009. ISBN 978-954-92032-6-4
- A. Kamburov and L. Ivanov. Bowles Ridge and Central Tangra Mountains: Livingston Island, Antarctica. Scale 1:25000 map. Sofia: Manfred Wörner Foundation, 2023. ISBN 978-619-90008-6-1
