= Devin Saddle =

Location of Tangra Mountains on Livingston Island in the South Shetland Islands

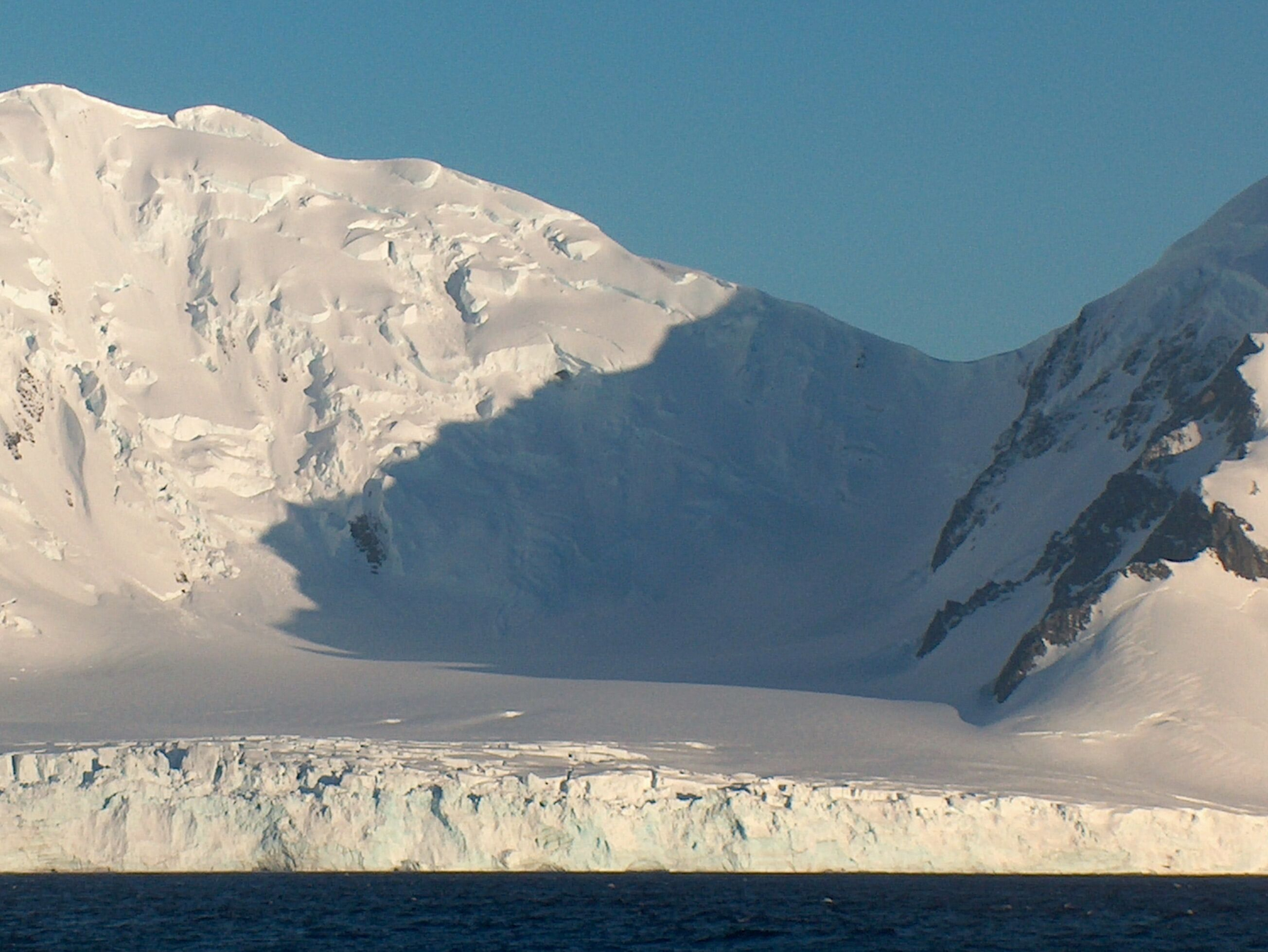
Devin Saddle from Bransfield Strait

Topographic map of Livingston Island, Greenwich, Robert, Snow and Smith Islands

Devin Saddle (Devinska Sedlovina \'de-vin-ska se-dlo-vi-'na\) is a saddle of 500 m (1,600 ft) in the Tangra Mountains, Livingston Island located between Levski Ridge to the west and Delchev Ridge to the east. It is part of the divide between the glacial catchments of Iskar Glacier to the north and Magura Glacier to the south. It is named after the Bulgarian town of Devin. Devin (Bulgarian: Девин [ˈdɛvin]) is a spa town in Smolyan Province in the far south of Bulgaria.

== Location ==
The saddle is located at 62°38′56″S 59°58′41″W, which is 1.7 km (1.1 mi) east of Plovdiv Peak and 1 km (0.62 mi) west-southwest of Ruse Peak.

== Maps ==
- L.L. Ivanov et al. Antarctica: Livingston Island and Greenwich Island, South Shetland Islands. Scale 1:100000 topographic map. Sofia: Antarctic Place-names Commission of Bulgaria, 2005.
- L.L. Ivanov. Antarctica: Livingston Island and Greenwich, Robert, Snow and Smith Islands. Scale 1:120000 topographic map. Troyan: Manfred Wörner Foundation, 2009.
