= Dobrudzha Glacier =

Glacier in Antarctica

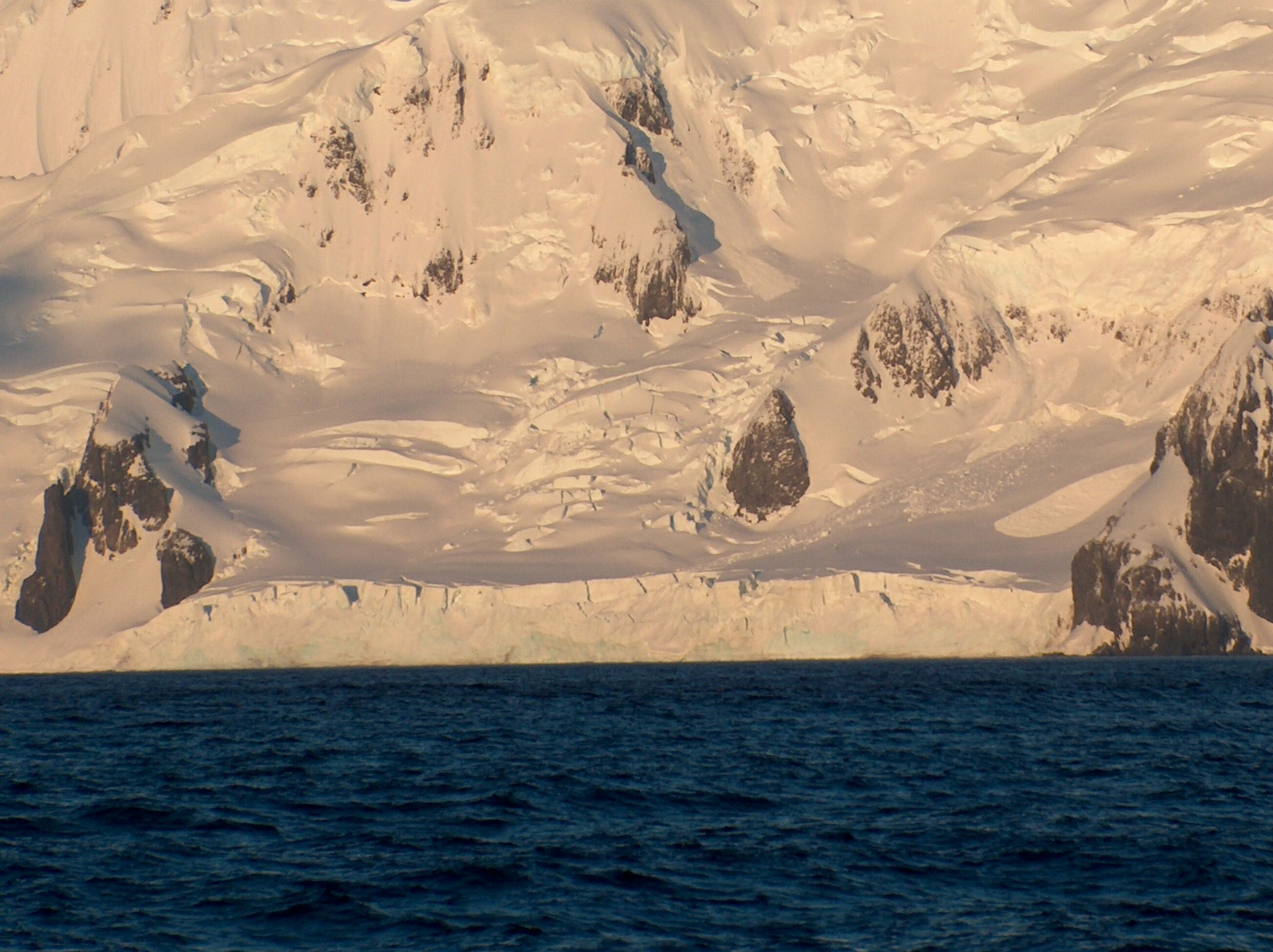
- Dobrudzha Glacier from Bransfield Strait

- Location within South Shetland Islands Location within Antarctica
- Location: Livingston Island
- Coordinates: 62°39′28″S 59°57′15″W
- Thickness: unknown
- Terminus: Bransfield Strait
- Status: unknown

Location of Tangra Mountains on Livingston Island in the South Shetland Islands.

Topographic map of Livingston Island and Smith Island

Dobrudzha Glacier (Bulgarian: ледник Добруджа, romanized: lednik Dobrudzha, IPA: [ˈlɛdniɡ ˈdɔbrod͡ʒɐ]) is situated on the southeast side of Tangra Mountains, Burgas Peninsula, eastern Livingston Island in the South Shetland Islands, northeast of Magura Glacier, southeast of Iskar Glacier and southwest of Ropotamo Glacier. It is bounded by Ruse Peak and Asen Peak to the north and by Kuber Peak to the west and flows southeastward into Bransfield Strait. The glacier is named after the Dobrudzha region in northeastern Bulgaria.

== Location ==
Dobrudzha Glacier is centred at 62°39′28″S 59°57′15″W.

== See also ==
- List of glaciers in the Antarctic
- Glaciology

== Maps ==
- L.L. Ivanov et al. Antarctica: Livingston Island and Greenwich Island, South Shetland Islands. Scale 1:100000 topographic map. Sofia: Antarctic Place-names Commission of Bulgaria, 2005.
- L.L. Ivanov. Antarctica: Livingston Island and Greenwich, Robert, Snow and Smith Islands. Scale 1:120000 topographic map. Troyan: Manfred Wörner Foundation, 2009.
