= Ruse Peak =

Peak in Antarctica

Location of Tangra Mountains on Livingston Island in the South Shetland Islands

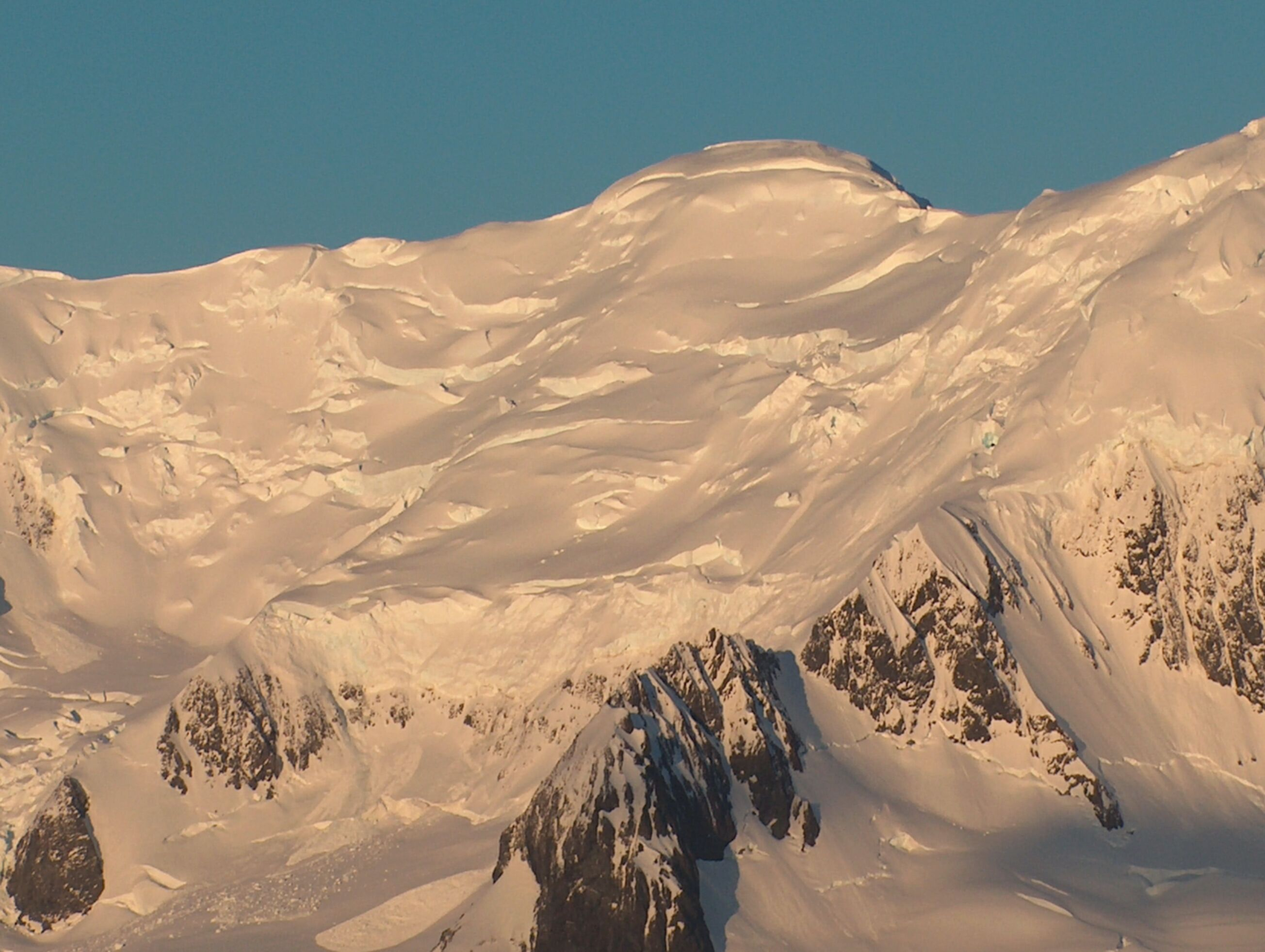
Ruse Peak from Bransfield Strait

Ruse Peak (Bulgarian: връх Русе, romanized: vrah Ruse, IPA: [ˈvrɤx ˈrusɛ]) is a peak rising to over 800 m in the west part of Delchev Ridge in Tangra Mountains on Livingston Island in the South Shetland Islands, Antarctica. The peak surmounts Iskar Glacier and Bruix Cove to the north, and Dobrudzha Glacier to the south.

The peak is named after the Bulgarian city of Ruse, also spelt Rousse in the past.

== Location ==
The peak is located at 62°38′55″S 59°57′25″W, which is 1.48 km southwest of Delchev Peak, 1.76 km east of Shishman Peak and 3.26 km south of Rila Point (Bulgarian mapping in 2005 and 2009).

== Maps ==
- South Shetland Islands. Scale 1:200000 topographic map. DOS 610 Sheet W 62 58. Tolworth, UK, 1968.
- Islas Livingston y Decepción. Mapa topográfico a escala 1:100000. Madrid: Servicio Geográfico del Ejército, 1991.
- S. Soccol, D. Gildea and J. Bath. Livingston Island, Antarctica. Scale 1:100000 satellite map. The Omega Foundation, USA, 2004.
- L.L. Ivanov et al., Antarctica: Livingston Island and Greenwich Island, South Shetland Islands (from English Strait to Morton Strait, with illustrations and ice-cover distribution), 1:100000 scale topographic map, Antarctic Place-names Commission of Bulgaria, Sofia, 2005
- L.L. Ivanov. Antarctica: Livingston Island and Greenwich, Robert, Snow and Smith Islands. Scale 1:120000 topographic map. Troyan: Manfred Wörner Foundation, 2010. ISBN 978-954-92032-9-5 (First edition 2009. ISBN 978-954-92032-6-4)
- Antarctic Digital Database (ADD). Scale 1:250000 topographic map of Antarctica. Scientific Committee on Antarctic Research (SCAR), 1993–2016.
