= Cherepish Ridge =

Ridge in the South Shetland Islands, Antarctica

Location of Tangra Mountains on Livingston Island in the South Shetland Islands.

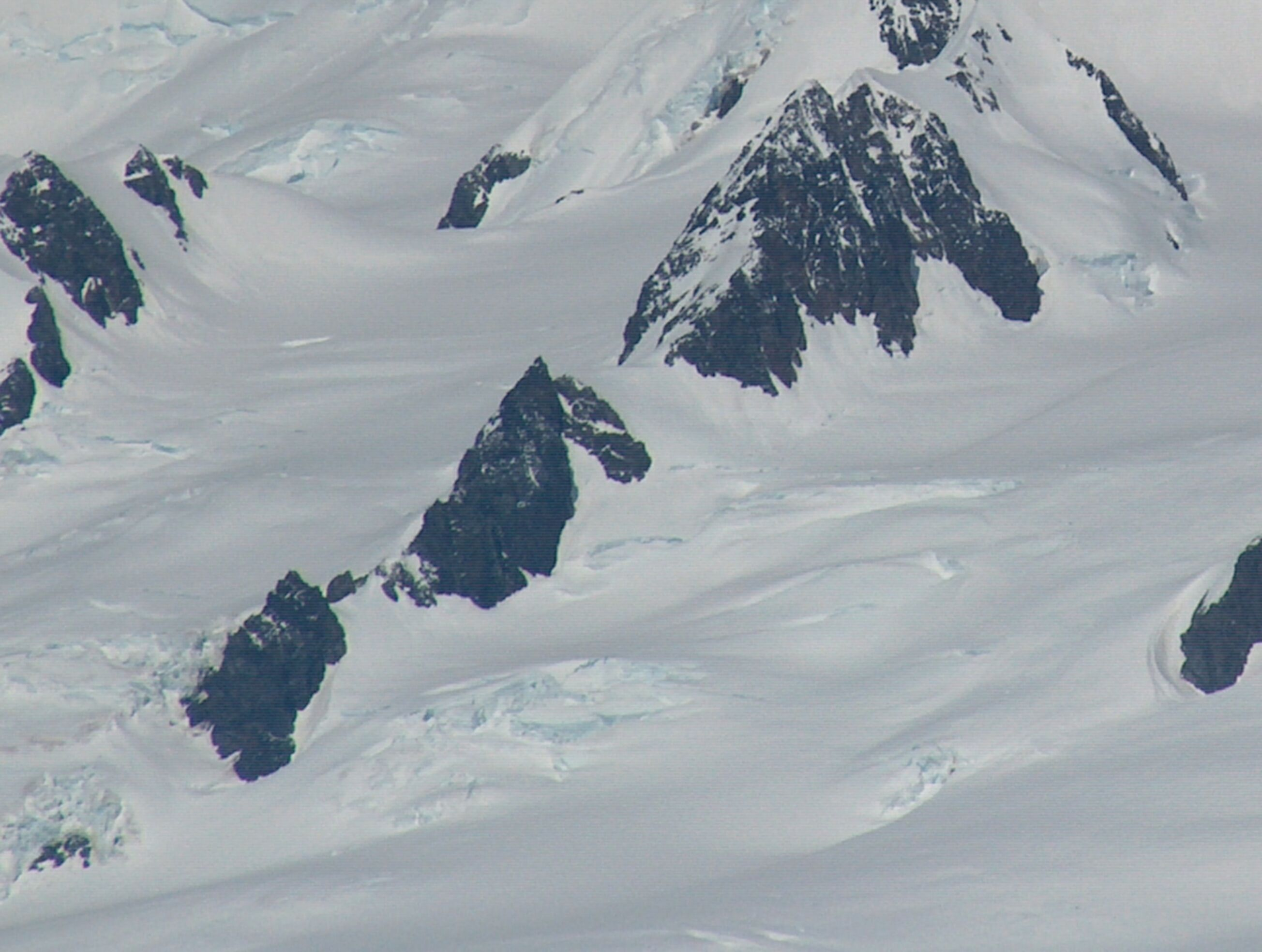
Cherepish Ridge from Zemen Knoll in Vidin Heights.

Topographic map of Livingston Island, Greenwich, Robert, Snow and Smith Islands.

Cherepish Ridge (Cherepishki Rid \che-re-'pish-ki 'rid\) is a narrow rocky 1.1 kilometres (3,600 ft) ridge in the South Shetland Islands of Antarctica. Rising to 650 metres (2,130 ft), the ridge runs in the south to north direction from the north of Intuition Peak, in the Tangra Mountains of Livingston Island. It was named after the Cherepish Monastery in the Iskar Gorge, Western Bulgaria.

== Location ==
The ridge is located at 62°38′24.4″S 60°02′15″W which is 1.85 km north by northwest of Helmet Peak, 6.3 km east of Kuzman Knoll and 4.89 km southeast of Atanasoff Nunatak.

Bulgarian mapping in 2005 and 2009 from the Tangra 2004/05 topographic survey.

== Maps ==
- L.L. Ivanov et al. Antarctica: Livingston Island and Greenwich Island, South Shetland Islands. Scale 1:100000 topographic map. Sofia: Antarctic Place-names Commission of Bulgaria, 2005.
- L.L. Ivanov. Antarctica: Livingston Island and Greenwich, Robert, Snow and Smith Islands. Scale 1:120000 topographic map. Troyan: Manfred Wörner Foundation, 2009. ISBN 978-954-92032-6-4
- A. Kamburov and L. Ivanov. Bowles Ridge and Central Tangra Mountains: Livingston Island, Antarctica. Scale 1:25000 map. Sofia: Manfred Wörner Foundation, 2023. ISBN 978-619-90008-6-1
