= Yana Point =

Point in the South Shetland Islands, Antarctica

Location of Livingston Island in the South Shetland Islands.

Topographic map of Livingston Island and Smith Island.

Yana Point (Bulgarian: нос Яна, ‘Nos Yana’ \'nos 'ya-na\) is the point forming the west side of the entrance to Bruix Cove in eastern Livingston Island in the South Shetland Islands, Antarctica. The point separates the glacier termini of Huron Glacier to the northwest and Iskar Glacier to the southeast. The feature is named after the settlement of Yana in western Bulgaria.

== Location ==
Yana Point is located at 62°37′24″S 60°00′34″W, which is 3.7 km north-northeast of Helmet Peak, 9 km south of Edinburgh Hill and 1.93 km west of Rila Point (Bulgarian topographic survey Tangra 2004/05 and mapping in 2009).

== Maps ==
- South Shetland Islands. Scale 1:200000 topographic map. DOS 610 Sheet W 62 60. Tolworth, UK, 1968.
- L.L. Ivanov et al. Antarctica: Livingston Island and Greenwich Island, South Shetland Islands. Scale 1:100000 topographic map. Sofia: Antarctic Place-names Commission of Bulgaria, 2005.
- L.L. Ivanov. Antarctica: Livingston Island and Greenwich, Robert, Snow and Smith Islands. Scale 1:120000 topographic map. Troyan: Manfred Wörner Foundation, 2010. ISBN 978-954-92032-9-5 (First edition 2009. ISBN 978-954-92032-6-4)
- Antarctic Digital Database (ADD). Scale 1:250000 topographic map of Antarctica. Scientific Committee on Antarctic Research (SCAR). Since 1993, regularly updated.
- L.L. Ivanov. Antarctica: Livingston Island and Smith Island. Scale 1:100000 topographic map. Manfred Wörner Foundation, 2017. ISBN 978-619-90008-3-0
- A. Kamburov and L. Ivanov. Bowles Ridge and Central Tangra Mountains: Livingston Island, Antarctica. Scale 1:25000 map. Sofia: Manfred Wörner Foundation, 2023. ISBN 978-619-90008-6-1
