= Levski Ridge =

In the Tangra Mountains, in Livingston Island, Antarctica

Location of Tangra Mountains on Livingston Island in the South Shetland Islands.

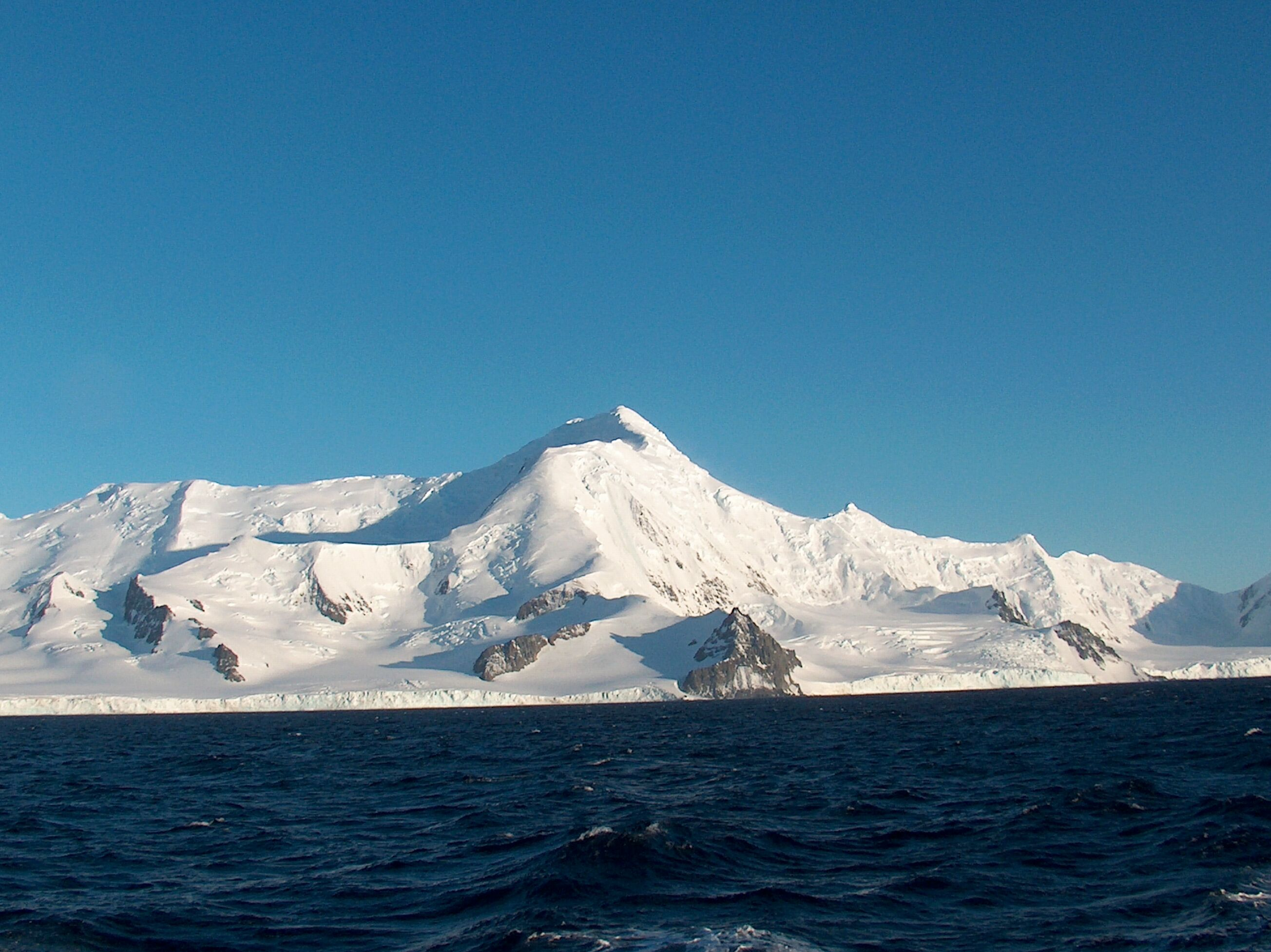
Levski Ridge from Bransfield Strait, with Great Needle Peak in the centre.

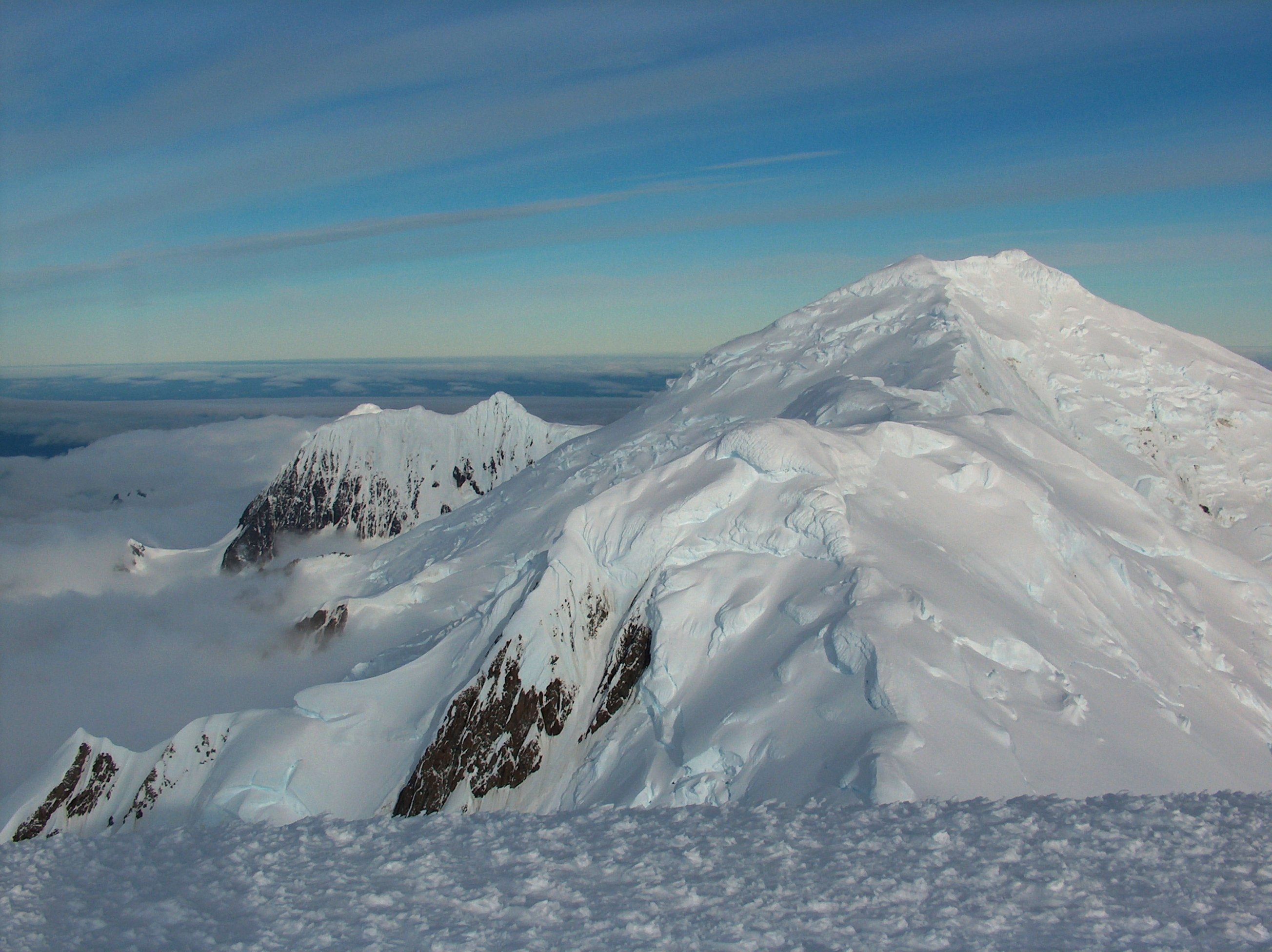
Levski Ridge from Lyaskovets Peak.

Topographic map of Livingston Island and Smith Island.

Levski Ridge (Bulgarian: Хребет Левски \'hre-bet 'lev-ski\) is the central ridge of the Tangra Mountains, Livingston Island. Its summit, Great Needle Peak rises to 1,680m and is the second highest summit of the island after Mount Friesland.

The ridge extends nearly 8 km between Shipka Saddle to the west and Devin Saddle to the east, and the same distance between Cherepish Ridge to the north and Christoff Cliff to the south. It is bounded by Huron Glacier to the north, Iskar Glacier to the northeast, Macy Glacier and Boyana Glacier to the southwest, and Srebarna Glacier and Magura Glacier to the southeast.

The ridge takes its name from Levski Peak. Remark: The name form ‘Great Needle’ has become established in usage for the ridge's summit, with ‘great’ considered more appropriate than the adjective ‘false’ in its Spanish name form ‘Pico Falsa Aguja’ as this major peak is hardly associated with the ‘true’ Needle Peak (Pico Aguja), a sharp black peak of elevation just 370 m situated near Samuel Point 8 km away.

== Location ==
The midpoint is located at 62°39′45″S 60°03′00″W which is situated 6.84 km east of Mount Friesland, 6.8 km southeast of Kuzman Knoll, 6.75 km west-southwest of Delchev Peak, and 3.3 km northwest of M'Kean Point (British mapping in 1968, Argentine mapping in 1980, and Bulgarian mapping in 2005 and 2009 from the topographic survey Tangra 2004/05).

== Maps ==
- L.L. Ivanov et al. Antarctica: Livingston Island and Greenwich Island, South Shetland Islands. Scale 1:100000 topographic map. Sofia: Antarctic Place-names Commission of Bulgaria, 2005.
- L.L. Ivanov. Antarctica: Livingston Island and Greenwich, Robert, Snow and Smith Islands. Scale 1:120000 topographic map. Troyan: Manfred Wörner Foundation, 2009. ISBN 978-954-92032-6-4
- L.L. Ivanov. Antarctica: Livingston Island and Smith Island. Scale 1:100000 topographic map. Manfred Wörner Foundation, 2017. ISBN 978-619-90008-3-0
- A. Kamburov and L. Ivanov. Bowles Ridge and Central Tangra Mountains: Livingston Island, Antarctica. Scale 1:25000 map. Sofia: Manfred Wörner Foundation, 2023. ISBN 978-619-90008-6-1
