= Magura Glacier =

Glacier in Antarctica

- Location of Tangra Mountains on Livingston Island in the South Shetland Islands

- Location within South Shetland Islands Location within Antarctica
- Location: Livingston Island; South Shetland Islands
- Coordinates: 62°39′55″S 60°00′00″W
- Length: 3.5 nautical miles (6.5 km; 4.0 mi)
- Width: 1 nautical mile (1.9 km; 1.2 mi)
- Thickness: unknown
- Terminus: Bransfield Strait
- Status: unknown

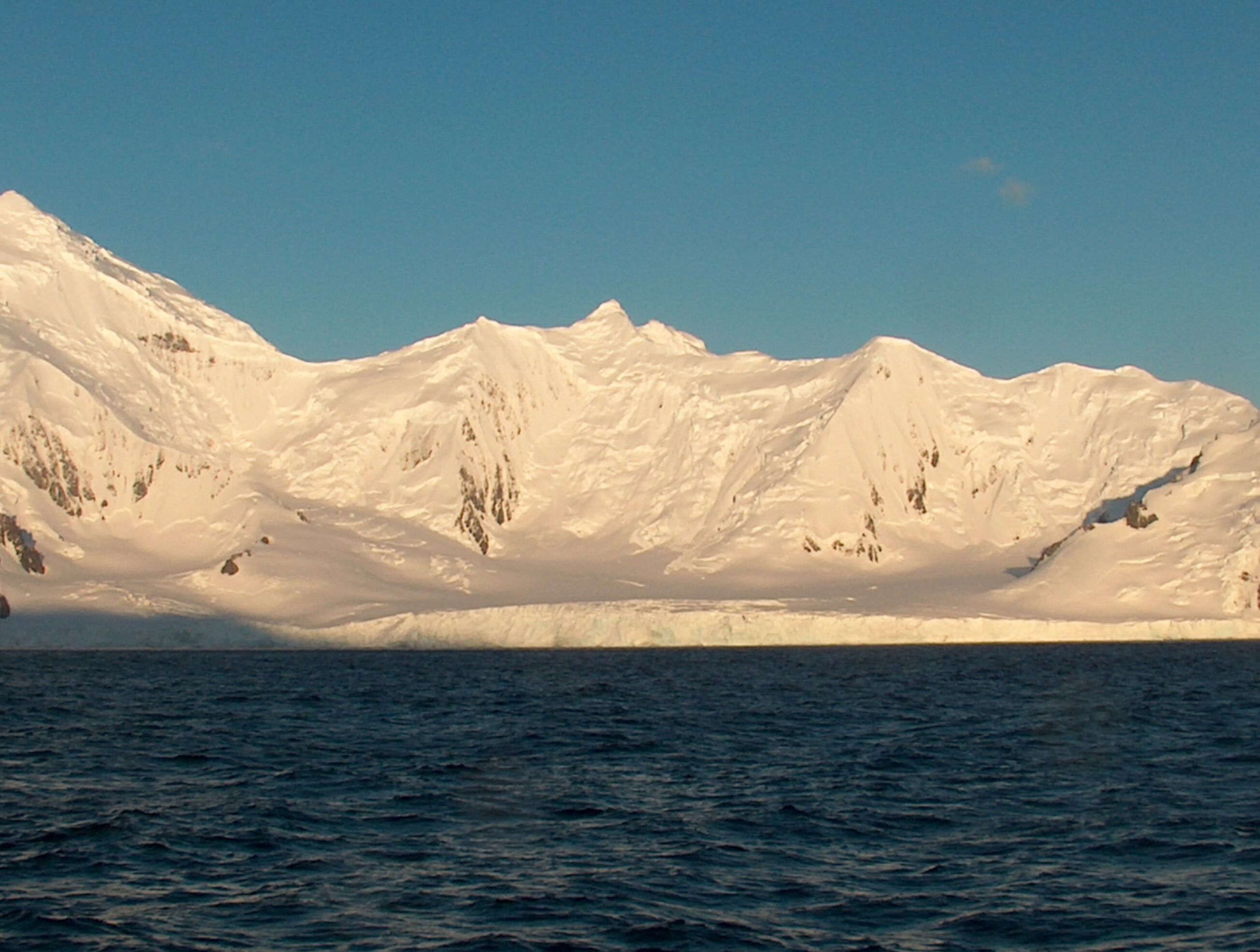
Magura Glacier from Bransfield Strait.

Topographic map of Livingston Island and Smith Island.

Magura Glacier (Bulgarian: ледник Магура, romanized: lednik Magura, IPA: [ˈlɛdnik mɐˈɡurɐ]) on the southeast side of Tangra Mountains on Livingston Island in the South Shetland Islands, Antarctica is located to the north of M'Kean Point, northeast of Srebarna Glacier, south of Iskar Glacier and southwest of Dobrudzha Glacier.

== Location ==
It is bounded by Great Needle Peak to the west, Vitosha Saddle, Vihren Peak and Helmet Peak to the northwest, Plovdiv Peak and Shishman Peak to the north, and Devin Saddle and Kuber Peak to the northeast. The glacier extends 3.5 km in southwest-northeast direction and 1.9 km in northwest-southeast direction, and flows southeastward into Bransfield Strait.

== Etymology ==
The feature is named after Magura Cave in Bulgaria.

== Location ==
Magura Glacier is centred at 62°39′55″S 60°00′00″W (Bulgarian mapping in 2005 and 2009).

== See also ==
- List of glaciers in the Antarctic
- Glaciology

== Maps ==
- South Shetland Islands. Scale 1:200000 topographic map. DOS 610 Sheet W 62 60. Tolworth, UK, 1968.
- South Shetland Islands. Scale 1:200000 topographic map. DOS 610 Sheet W 62 58. Tolworth, UK, 1968.
- Islas Livingston y Decepción. Mapa topográfico a escala 1:100000. Madrid: Servicio Geográfico del Ejército, 1991.
- S. Soccol, D. Gildea and J. Bath. Livingston Island, Antarctica. Scale 1:100000 satellite map. The Omega Foundation, USA, 2004.
- L.L. Ivanov et al., Antarctica: Livingston Island and Greenwich Island, South Shetland Islands (from English Strait to Morton Strait, with illustrations and ice-cover distribution), 1:100000 scale topographic map, Antarctic Place-names Commission of Bulgaria, Sofia, 2005
- L.L. Ivanov. Antarctica: Livingston Island and Greenwich, Robert, Snow and Smith Islands. Scale 1:120000 topographic map. Troyan: Manfred Wörner Foundation, 2010. ISBN 978-954-92032-9-5 (First edition 2009. ISBN 978-954-92032-6-4)
- Antarctic Digital Database (ADD). Scale 1:250000 topographic map of Antarctica. Scientific Committee on Antarctic Research (SCAR). Since 1993, regularly upgraded and updated.
- L.L. Ivanov. Antarctica: Livingston Island and Smith Island. Scale 1:100000 topographic map. Manfred Wörner Foundation, 2017. ISBN 978-619-90008-3-0
- A. Kamburov and L. Ivanov. Bowles Ridge and Central Tangra Mountains: Livingston Island, Antarctica. Scale 1:25000 map. Sofia: Manfred Wörner Foundation, 2023. ISBN 978-619-90008-6-1
