= Bruix Cove =

Location of Livingston Island in the South Shetland Islands.

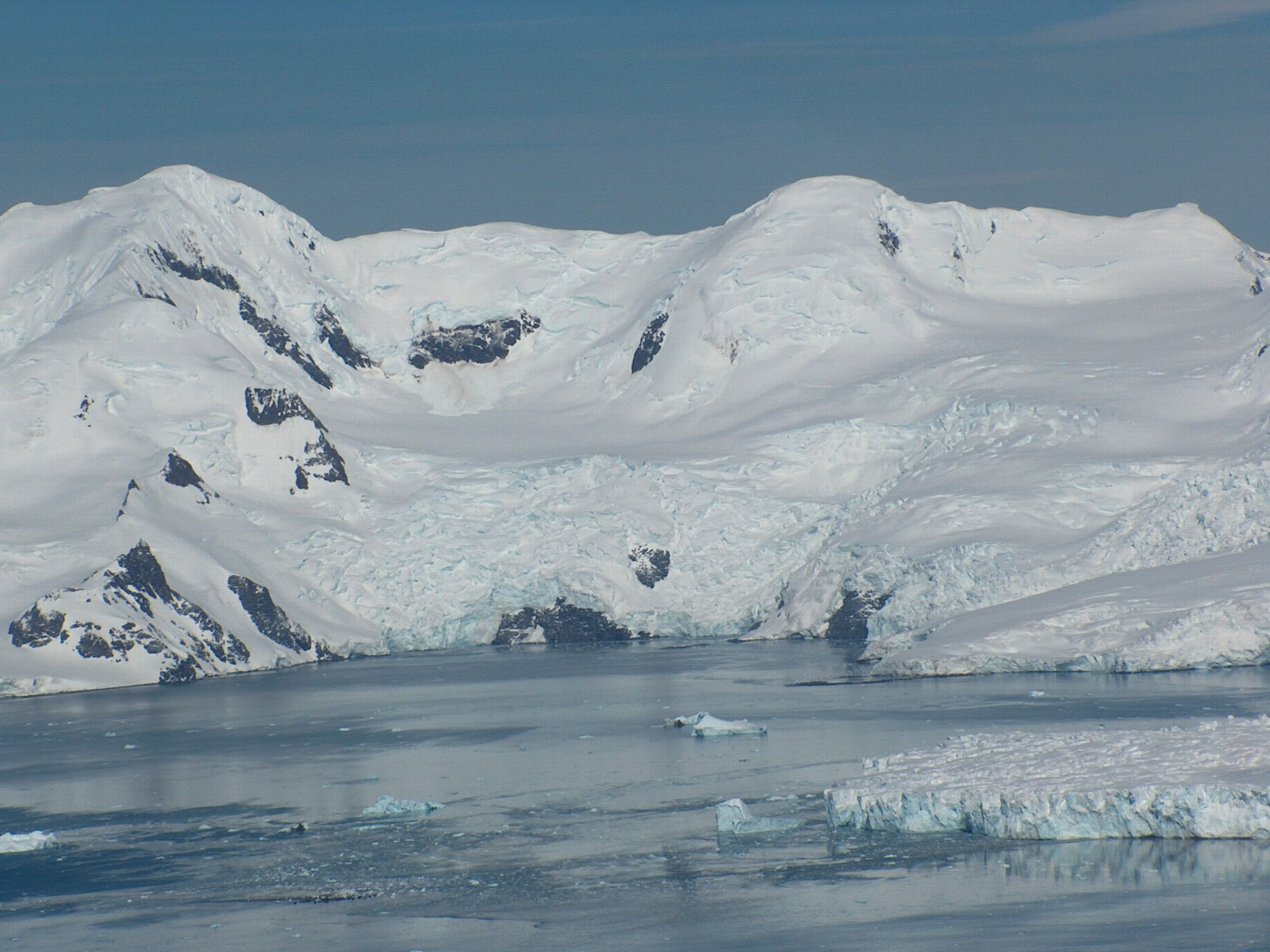
Bruix Cove (in the background) from Miziya Peak, surmounted by Delchev Peak and Ruse Peak.

Topographic map of Livingston Island.

Bruix Cove is the 1.93 km wide cove indenting for 1.75 km the south coast of Moon Bay in eastern Livingston Island, the South Shetland Islands in Antarctica. Entered between Yana Point and Rila Point. Most of the cove's coastline is formed by the terminus of Iskar Glacier.

The feature is named after Baron Alexis-Vital-Joseph (Spanish: Alejo) de Bruix (c. 1790–1825), a French military who took part in the Napoleonic Wars and the Spanish American wars of independence.

== Location ==
Bruix Cove is located at 62°37′40″S 59°59′00″W. British mapping in 1968, Chilean in 1971, Argentine in 1980, Spanish in 1991, and Bulgarian in 2005 and 2009.

== Maps ==
- South Shetland Islands. Scale 1:200000 topographic map. DOS 610 Sheet W 62 60. Tolworth, UK, 1968.
- South Shetland Islands. Scale 1:200000 topographic map. DOS 610 Sheet W 62 58. Tolworth, UK, 1968.
- Islas Livingston y Decepción. Mapa topográfico a escala 1:100000. Madrid: Servicio Geográfico del Ejército, 1991.
- L.L. Ivanov et al. Antarctica: Livingston Island and Greenwich Island, South Shetland Islands. Scale 1:100000 topographic map. Sofia: Antarctic Place-names Commission of Bulgaria, 2005.
- L.L. Ivanov. Antarctica: Livingston Island and Greenwich, Robert, Snow and Smith Islands. Scale 1:120000 topographic map. Troyan: Manfred Wörner Foundation, 2009. ISBN 978-954-92032-6-4
- Antarctic Digital Database (ADD). Scale 1:250000 topographic map of Antarctica. Scientific Committee on Antarctic Research (SCAR), 1993–2016.
