= Tangra Mountains =

Mountains in Antarctica

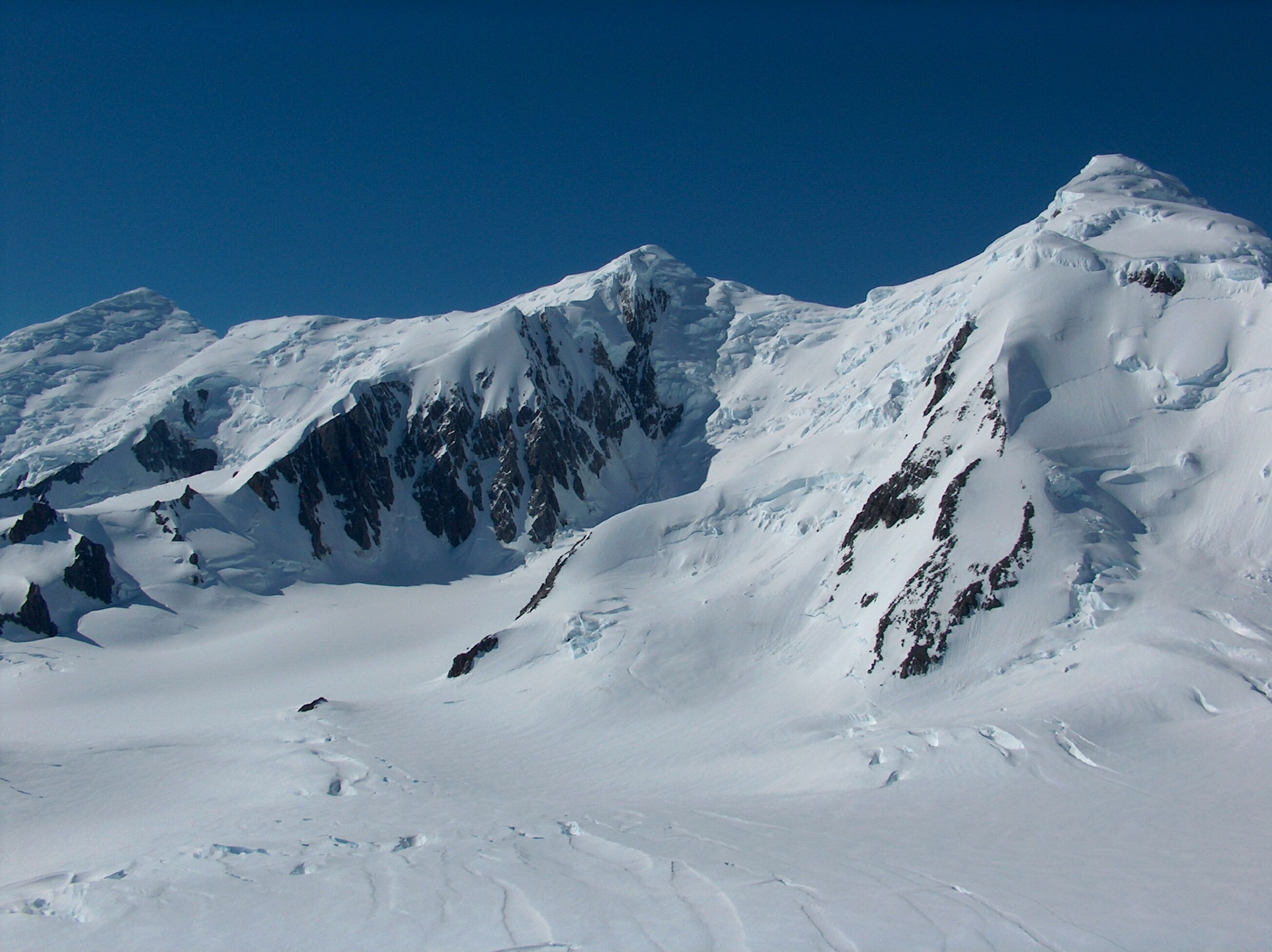
- Central Tangra Mountains

Highest point
- Peak: Mount Friesland
- Elevation: 1,700 m (5,600 ft)

Dimensions
- Length: 32 km (20 mi)
- Width: 8.5 km (5.3 mi)

Geography
- Location of Tangra Mountains on Livingston Island in the South Shetland Islands
- Continent: Antarctica
- Region: South Shetland Islands
- Range coordinates: 62°40′00″S 60°06′00″W

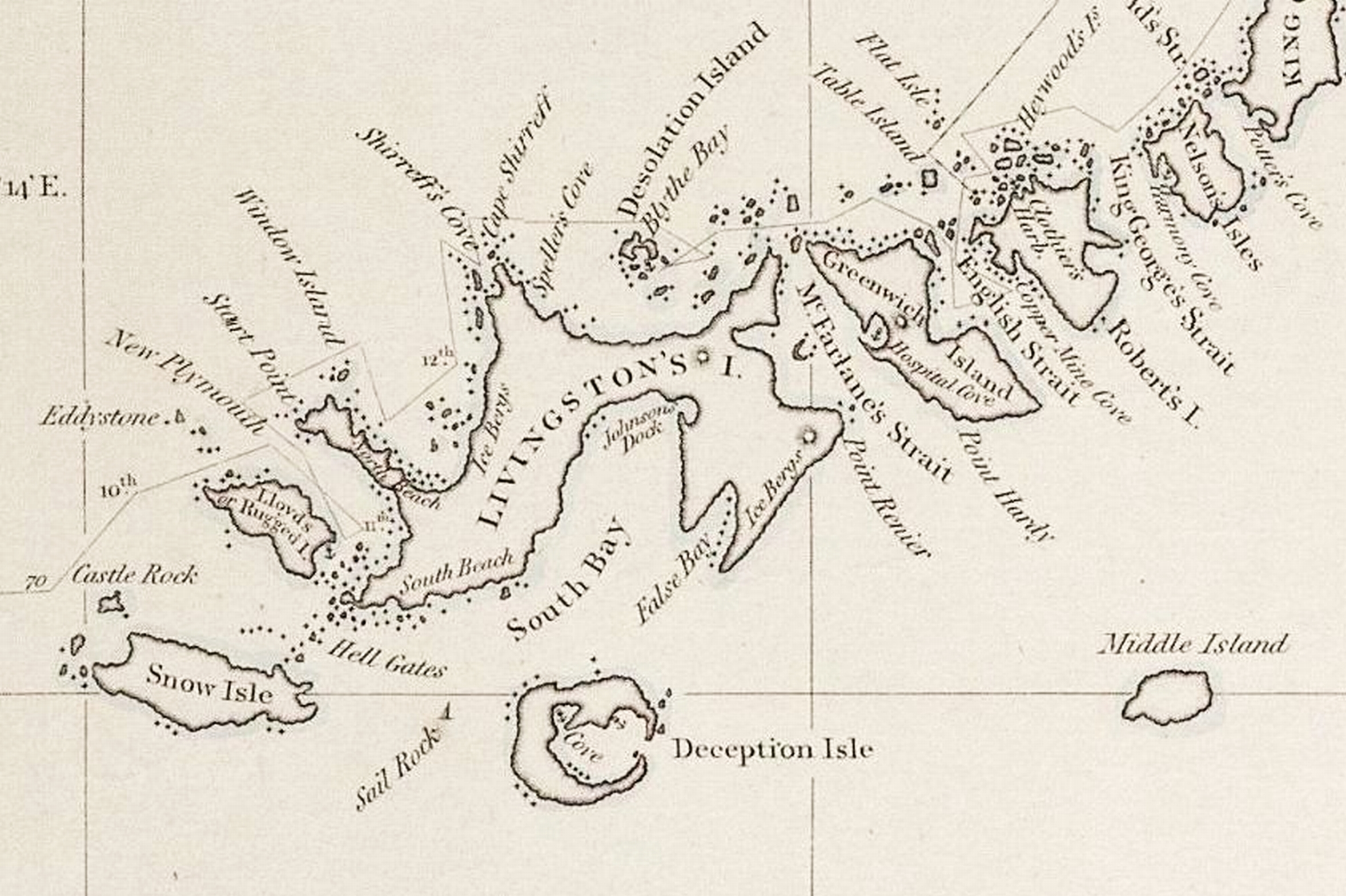
Tangra Mountains (indicated by the right-side inscription 'Ice Bergs') on a fragment of George Powell's 1822 chart of the South Shetland Islands and South Orkney Islands

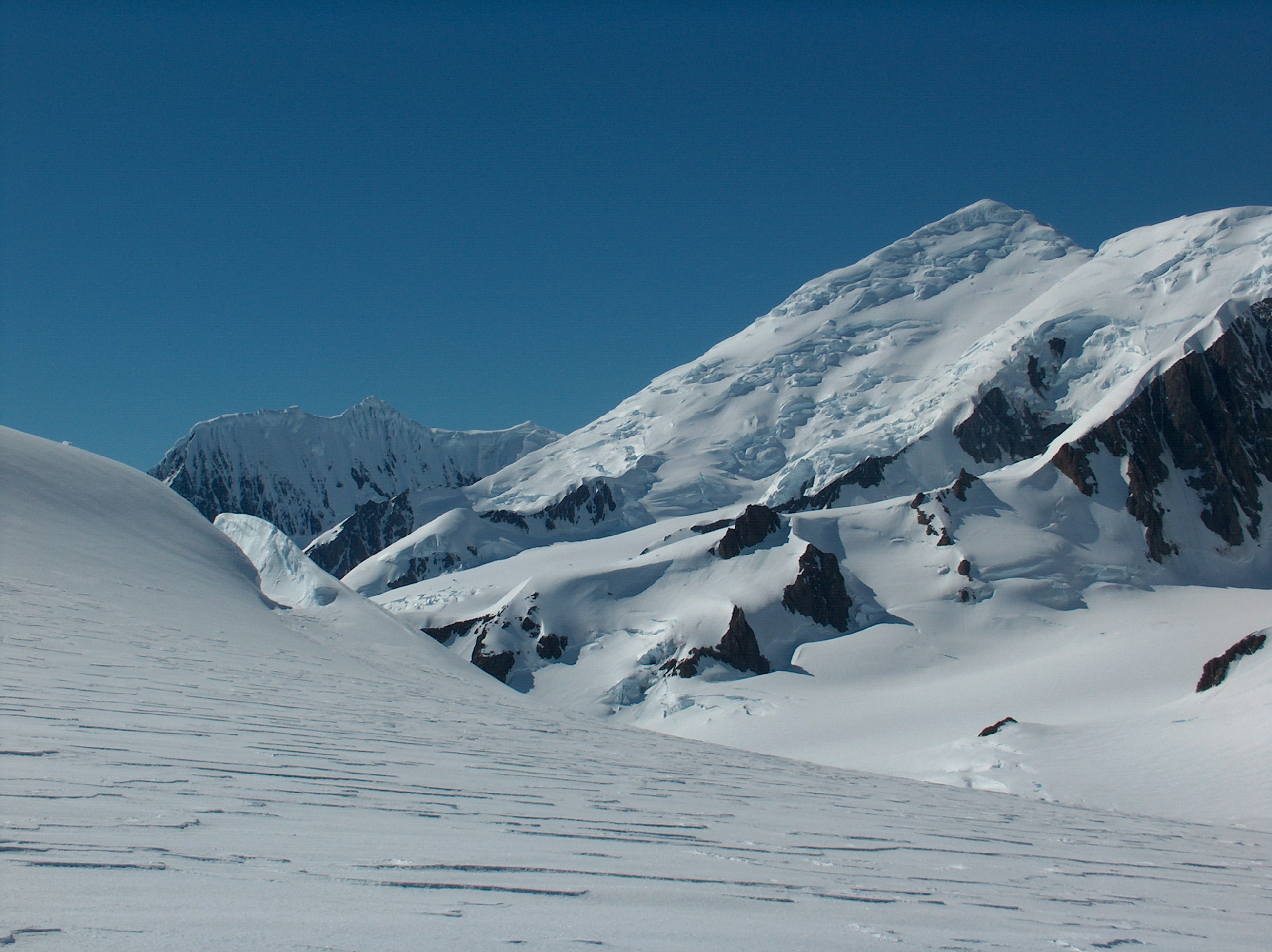
Helmet Peak and Sofia Peak from Kuzman Knoll

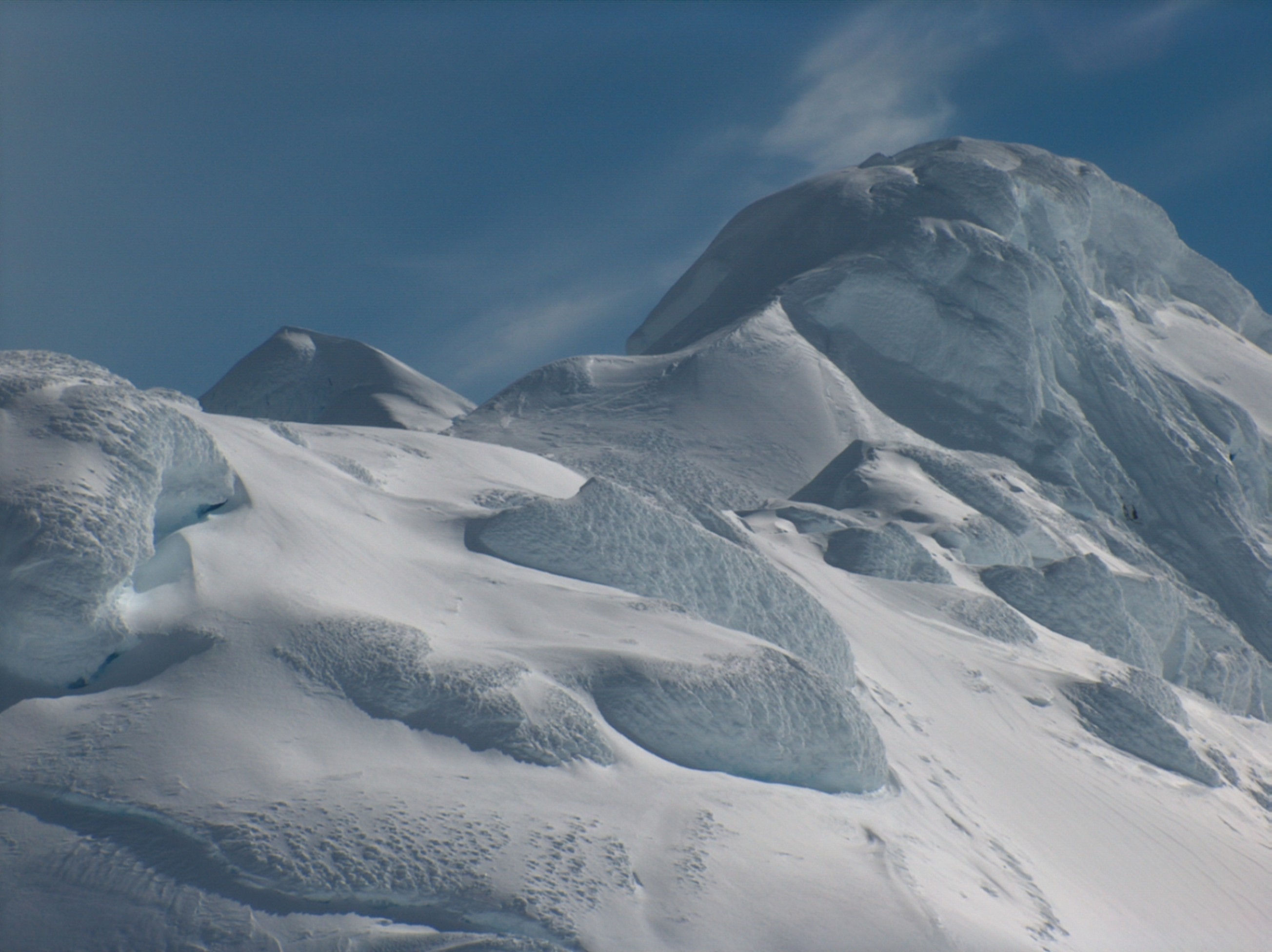
Mount Friesland from the west slope of Lyaskovets Peak

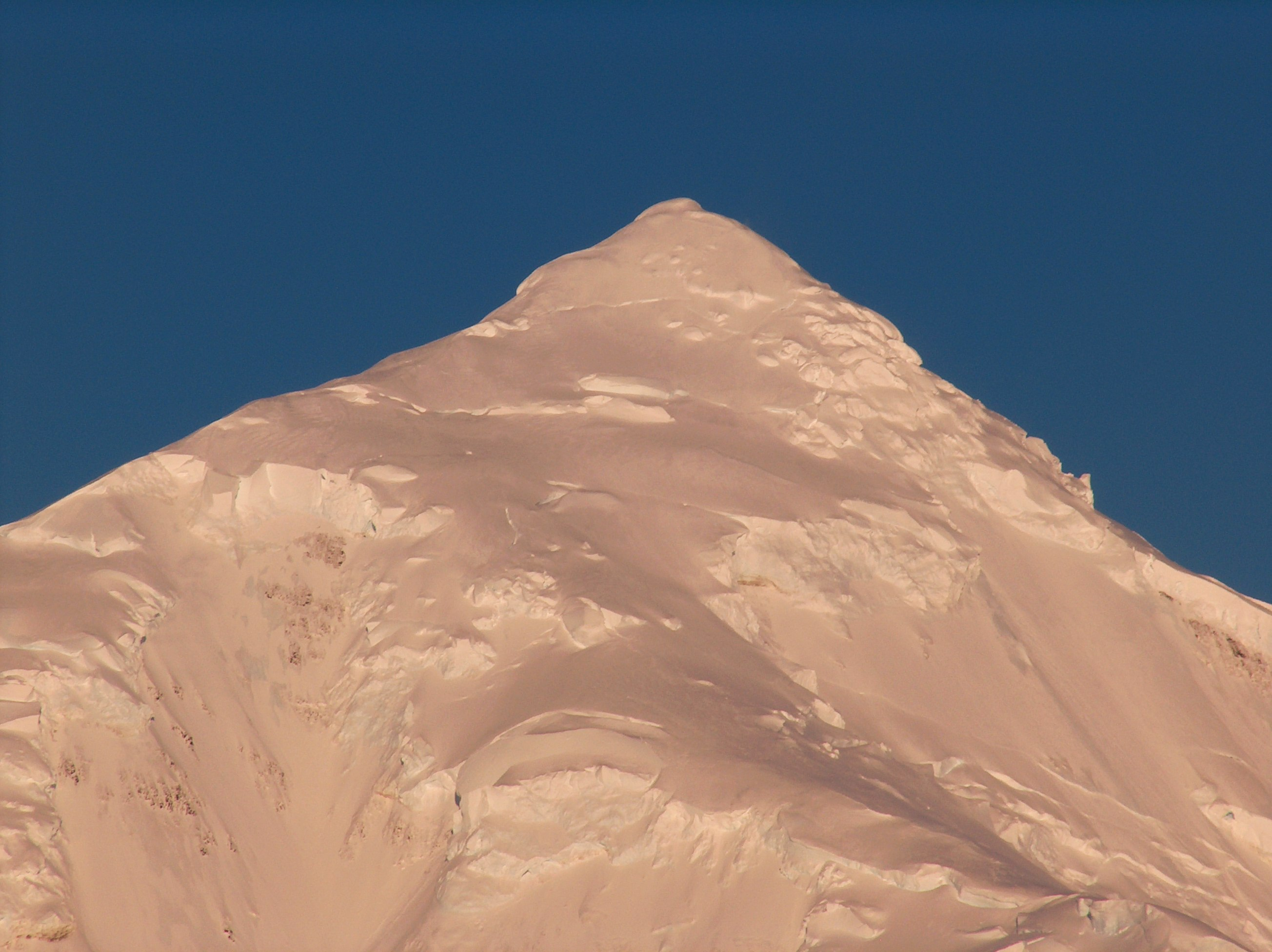
Great Needle Peak from Bransfield Strait

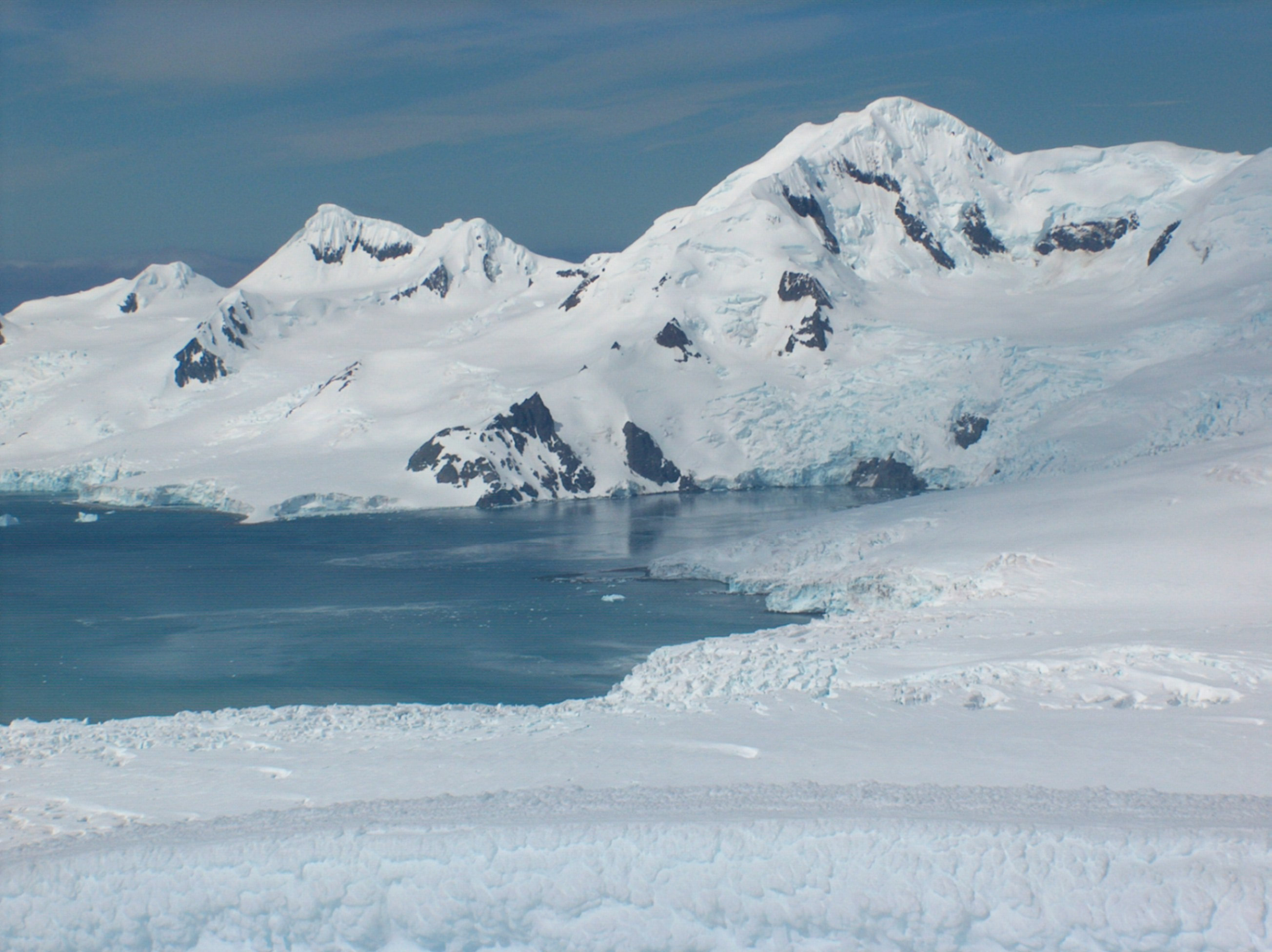
Delchev Ridge from Melnik Peak

Tangra Mountains (in Bulgarian Тангра планина, 'Tangra planina' \'tan-gra pla-ni-'na\) (62°40′00″S 60°06′00″W) form the principal mountain range of Livingston Island in the South Shetland Islands, Antarctica. The range had been nameless until 2001, when it was named after Tengri (Bulgarian Tangra), "the name of the ancient Bulgarian god."

Tangra Mountains are 32 kilometres (20 mi) long between Barnard Point and Renier Point, 8.5 kilometres (5.3 mi) wide, and are bounded by Moon Bay and Huron Glacier to the north, Huntress Glacier to the northwest, False Bay to the west, and Bransfield Strait to the southeast, and is linked to Bowles Ridge by Wörner Gap, and to Pliska Ridge by Nesebar Gap. The mountain is divided in three principal ridges: Friesland Ridge in the west, Levski Ridge in the centre, and Delchev Ridge in the east.

The peaks and slopes of Tangra are heavily glaciated, and drained by the glaciers Huron, Huntress, Ruen Icefall, Peshtera, Charity, Tarnovo Ice Piedmont, Prespa, Macy, Boyana, Srebarna, Magura, Dobrudzha, Ropotamo, Strandzha, Pautalia, Sopot Ice Piedmont, and Iskar.

Camp Academia in the northwestern foothills of Zograf Peak is the perfect gateway to central Tangra Mountains via Catalunyan Saddle (1260 m) to the south and Lozen Saddle (437 m) to the east. Catalunyan Saddle was occupied by a bivouac of the Tangra 2004/05 Exploration team on 14–16 December 2004.

== Friesland Ridge ==
Friesland Ridge is 15.5 km long from Botev Point in the southwest to Shipka Saddle to the northeast. The summit Mount Friesland (62°40′14.9″S 60°11′10.7″W) rises to exactly 1,700 m. It was accurately measured by GPS in December 2003 by the Omega Foundation expedition led by Damien Gildea, which made the second ascent of Mount Friesland. Other main peaks are St. Boris (1,699 m), Simeon (1,580 m), St. Cyril (1,505 m), Lyaskovets (1,473 m), Presian Ridge (1,456 m), St. Methodius (1,180 m), Academia (1,253 m), and Zograf (1,011 m).The first ascents of Mount Friesland have been by Francesc Sàbat and Jorge Enrique from Juan Carlos I Base on 30 December 1991; Lyaskovets Peak by L. Ivanov and D. Vasilev from Camp Academia on 14 December 2004; Zograf Peak by L. Ivanov from Camp Academia on 31 December 2004; Simeon Peak by D. Boyanov, N. Petkov and N. Hazarbasanov from Huntress Glacier on 15 January 2017; and St. Boris Peak by D. Boyanov and N. Petkov from Camp Academia area on 22 December 2016.

== Levski Ridge ==
Levski Ridge is 8 km long between Shipka Saddle to the west and Devin Saddle to the east, and 8 km wide between Cherepish Ridge to the north and Christoff Cliff to the south. The summit Great Needle Peak (62°40′15″S 60°03′10″W) rises to 1680 m, and was first ascended and GPS-surveyed by the Bulgarian mountaineers Doychin Boyanov, Nikolay Petkov and Aleksander Shopov on 8 January 2015. Other main peaks are Levski (1430 m), St. Ivan Rilski Col (1350 m), Helmet (1254 m), Serdica (1200 m), Vihren (1150 m), Ongal (1149 m), and Plovdiv (1040 m). Other first ascents: Ongal Peak and Komini Peak (774 m) by L. Ivanov from Camp Academia on 21 December 2004, and Plana Peak by D. Boyanov, N. Petkov and A. Shopov on 8 January 2015.

== Delchev Ridge ==
Delchev Ridge is 10 km long between Devin Saddle to the west and Renier Point to the east. The summit Delchev Peak (62°38′28″S 59°56′16″W) rises to 940 m, other main peaks are Ruse (800 m), Asen (800 m), Peter (800 m), Kuber (770 m), Elena (700 m), Spartacus (650 m), Yavorov (640 m), and Paisiy (550 m).

== Mapping ==
British mapping of the mountains in 1968, Spanish mapping in 1991, Omega Foundation mapping in 2004, Bulgarian mapping in 2005 and 2009 from topographic surveys in 1995/96 and 2004/05.

- S. Soccol, D. Gildea and J. Bath. Livingston Island, Antarctica. Scale 1:100000 satellite map. The Omega Foundation, USA, 2004.
- L.L. Ivanov, N. Glavinchev, R. Tosheva and S. Naydenov. Antarctica: Livingston Island and Greenwich Island, South Shetland Islands (from English Strait to Morton Strait, with illustrations and ice-cover distribution). Scale 1:100000 topographic map. Sofia: Antarctic Place-names Commission of Bulgaria, 2005.
- L.L. Ivanov. Antarctica: Livingston Island and Greenwich, Robert, Snow and Smith Islands. Scale 1:120000 topographic map. Troyan: Manfred Wörner Foundation, 2010. ISBN 978-954-92032-9-5 (First edition 2009. ISBN 978-954-92032-6-4)
- L.L. Ivanov. Antarctica: Livingston Island and Smith Island. Scale 1:100000 topographic map. Manfred Wörner Foundation, 2017. ISBN 978-619-90008-3-0
- A. Kamburov and L. Ivanov. Bowles Ridge and Central Tangra Mountains: Livingston Island, Antarctica. Scale 1:25000 map. Sofia: Manfred Wörner Foundation, 2023. ISBN 978-619-90008-6-1

== See also ==
- Geographical features on Livingston Island
- Antarctic Place-names Commission
- St. Kliment Ohridski Base
- Camp Academia
- Tangra 2004/05 Expedition
- Bansko Peak

== Honours ==
Tangra Mountains Street in the city of Sofia is named after the feature.
