= Helmet Peak (Livingston Island) =

Mountain in Livingston Island, South Shetland Islands, Antarctica

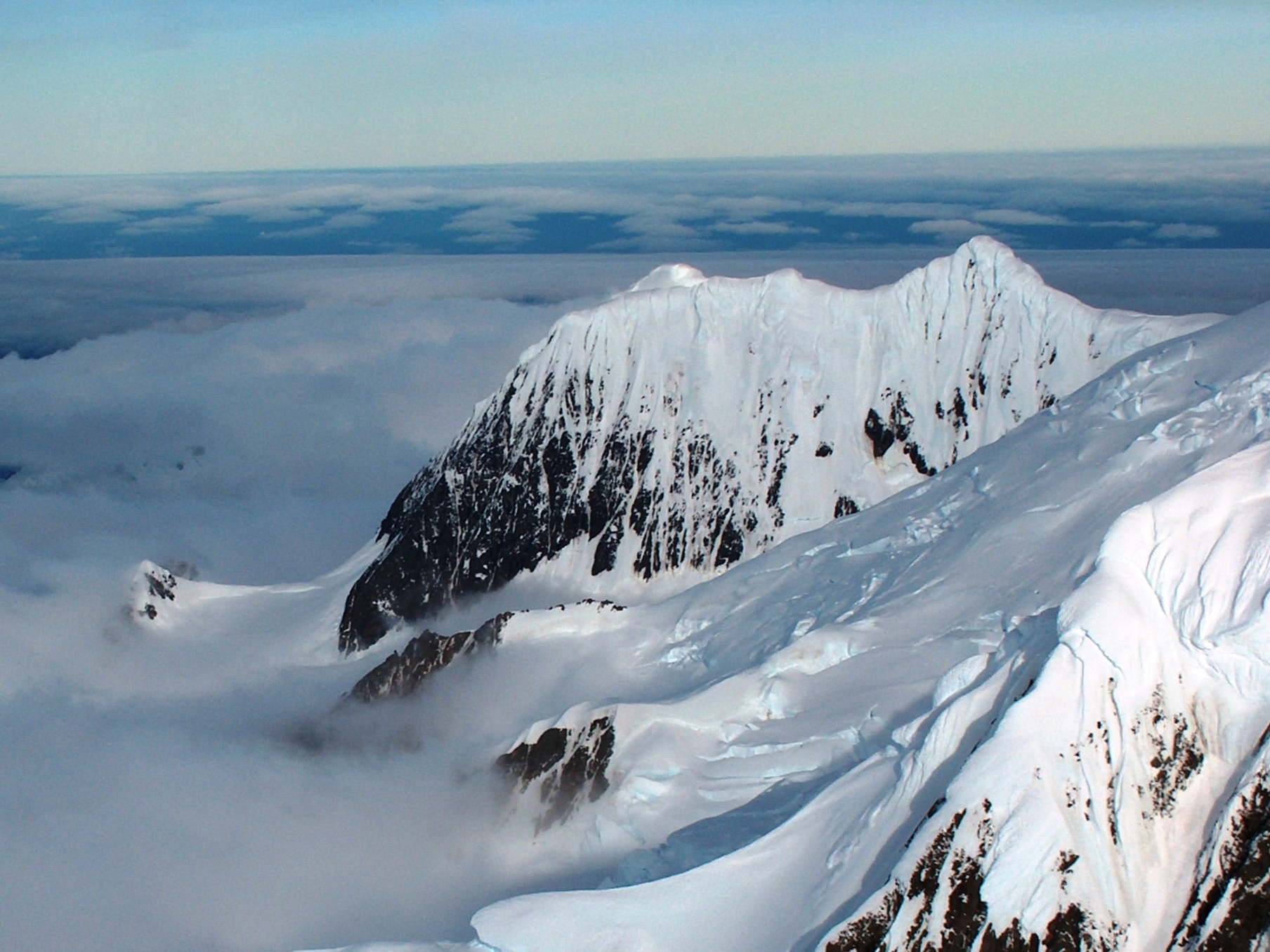
- Helmet Peak from Lyaskovets Peak

Highest point
- Elevation: 1,254 m (4,114 ft)
- Coordinates: 62°39′S 60°01′W

Geography
- Location: Livingston Island, Antarctica
- Parent range: Tangra Mountains

Climbing
- First ascent: unclimbed

Helmet Peak is a conspicuous peak rising to 1,254 metres (4,114 ft) in Levski Ridge, Tangra Mountains on Livingston Island in the South Shetland Islands, Antarctica just southward of the mouth of Huron Glacier. It is bounded by Devnya Valley to the west, Iskar Glacier to the northeast, and Magura Glacier to the southeast, and has precipitous west and east slopes. It was named by Discovery Investigations personnel during the period 1926–32.

== Location ==
The peak is located at (62°40′11″S 60°03′15″W) which is 2.15 km northeast of Great Needle Peak, 1.66 km east-southeast of Tutrakan Peak, 1.39 km south of Intuition Peak, 1.17 km west of Plovdiv Peak and 2.8 km north of Radichkov Peak.

== Maps ==
- South Shetland Islands. Scale 1:200000 topographic map. DOS 610 Sheet W 62 60. Tolworth, UK, 1968.
- L.L. Ivanov et al. Antarctica: Livingston Island and Greenwich Island, South Shetland Islands. Scale 1:100000 topographic map. Sofia: Antarctic Place-names Commission of Bulgaria, 2005.
- L.L. Ivanov. Antarctica: Livingston Island and Greenwich, Robert, Snow and Smith Islands. Scale 1:120000 topographic map. Troyan: Manfred Wörner Foundation, 2010. ISBN 978-954-92032-9-5 (First edition 2009. ISBN 978-954-92032-6-4)
- Antarctic Digital Database (ADD). Scale 1:250000 topographic map of Antarctica. Scientific Committee on Antarctic Research (SCAR). Since 1993, regularly updated.
- L.L. Ivanov. Antarctica: Livingston Island and Smith Island. Scale 1:100000 topographic map. Manfred Wörner Foundation, 2017. ISBN 978-619-90008-3-0
- A. Kamburov and L. Ivanov. Bowles Ridge and Central Tangra Mountains: Livingston Island, Antarctica. Scale 1:25000 map. Sofia: Manfred Wörner Foundation, 2023. ISBN 978-619-90008-6-1

== Gallery ==
Location of Tangra Mountains on Livingston Island in the South Shetland Islands

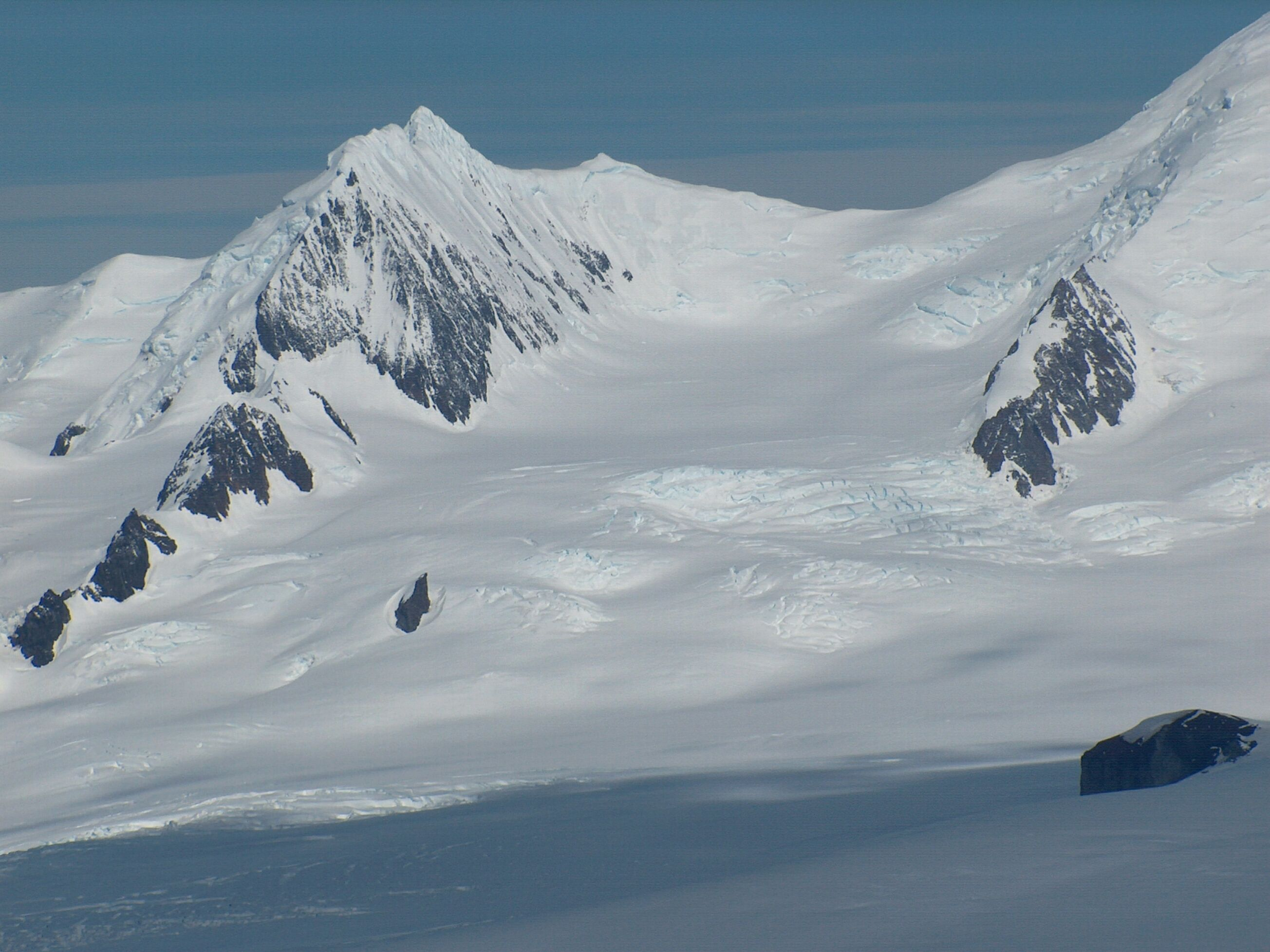
Helmet Peak and Devnya Valley from Zemen Knoll, with Vitosha Saddle in the background and Zlatograd Rock in the right foreground

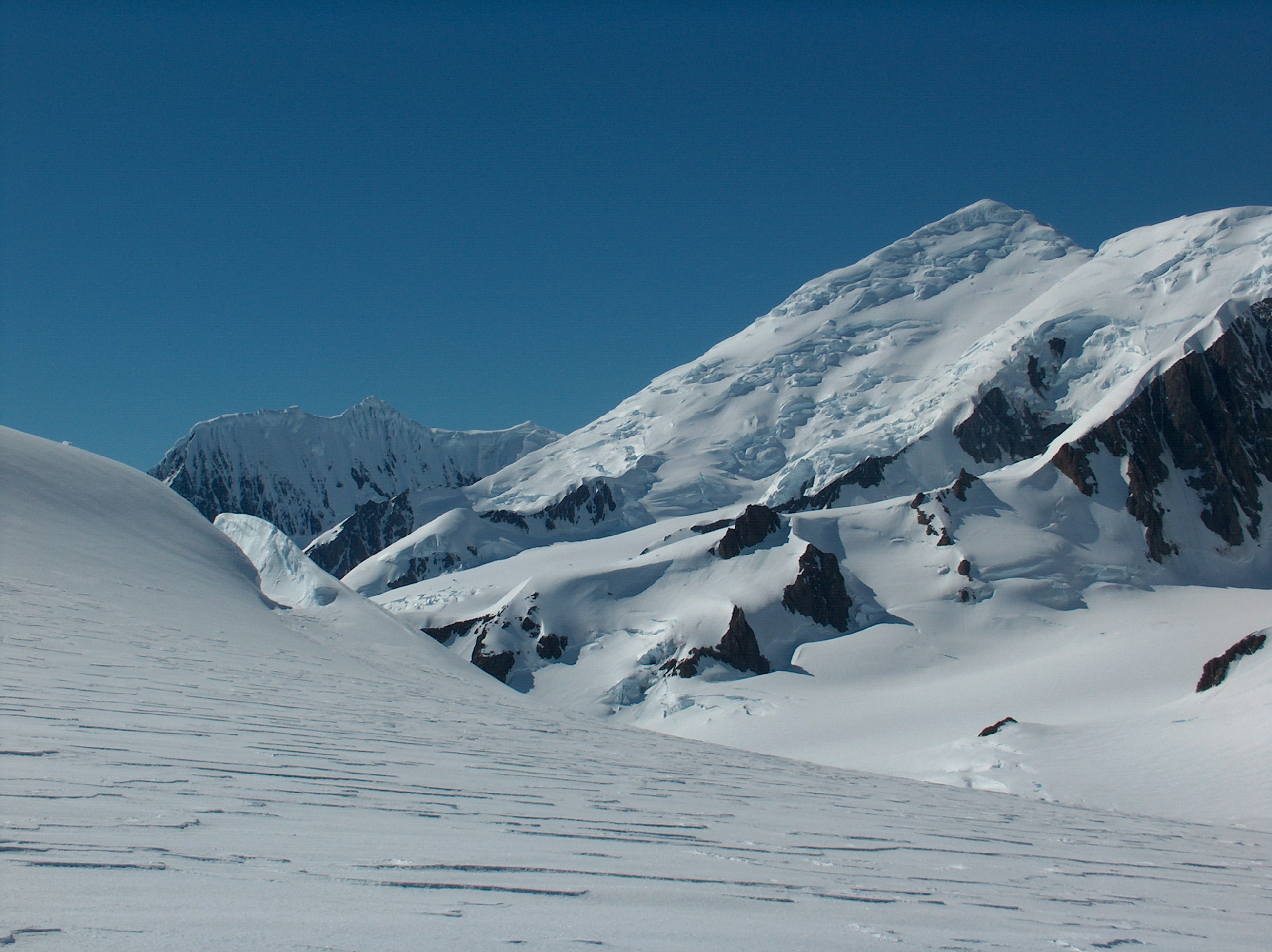
Helmet Peak (in the left background) and Great Needle Peak from Kuzman Knoll

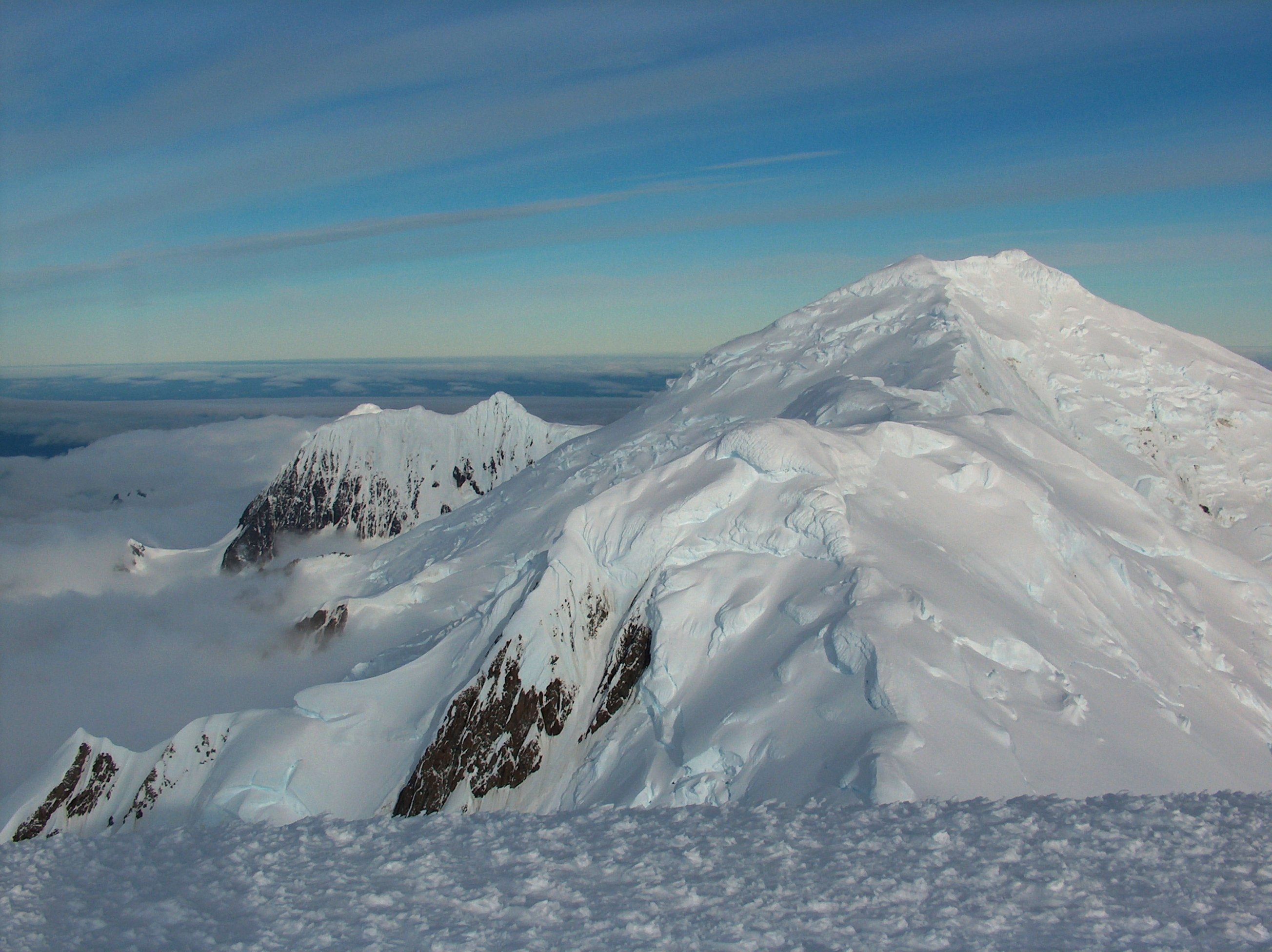
Helmet Peak from Lyaskovets Peak, with Levski Peak, St. Ivan Rilski Col and Great Needle Peak on the right

Topographic map of Livingston Island and Smith Island

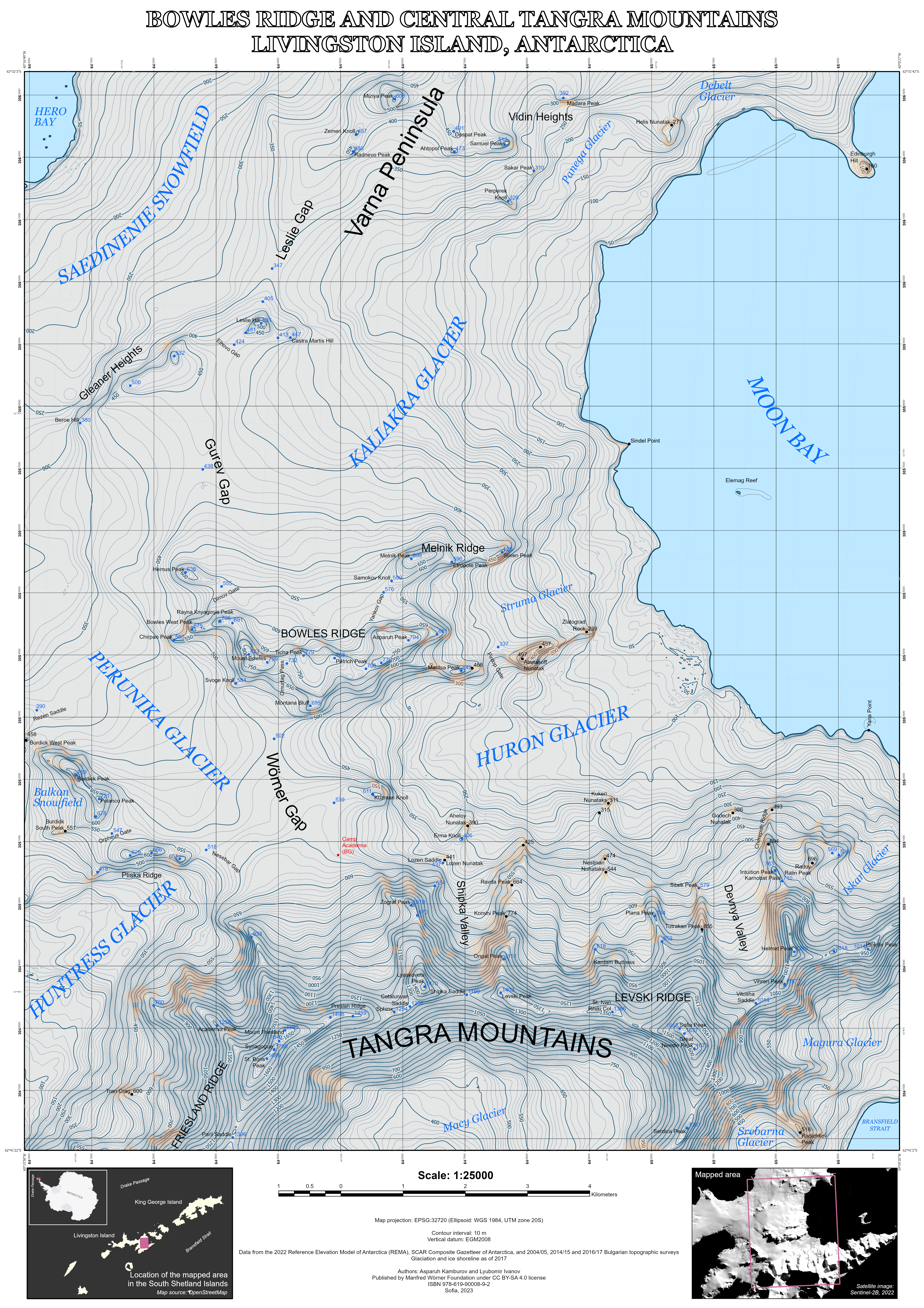
Topographic map of Bowles Ridge and Central Tangra Mountains featuring Helmet Peak
