= Huron Glacier =

Glacial flow on Livingston Island in the South Shetland Islands, Antarctica

- Location within South Shetland Islands Location within Antarctica
- Location: Livingston Island; South Shetland Islands
- Coordinates: 62°37′50″S 60°06′50″W
- Length: 4.8 nautical miles (8.9 km; 5.5 mi)
- Width: 2.2 nautical miles (4.1 km; 2.5 mi)
- Thickness: unknown
- Terminus: Moon Bay
- Status: unknown

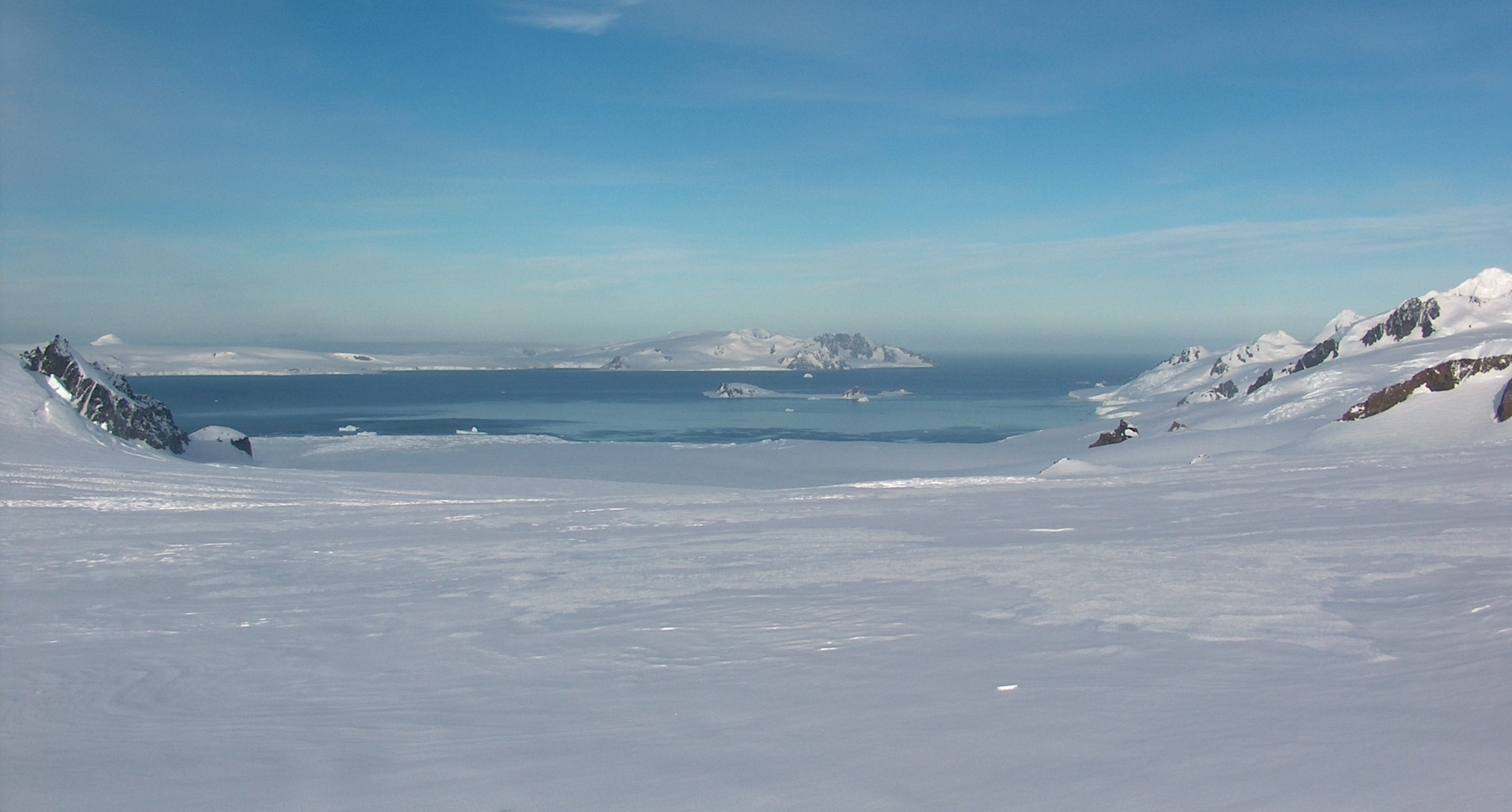
Huron Glacier from Camp Academia, with Moon Bay, Half Moon Island and Greenwich Island in the background

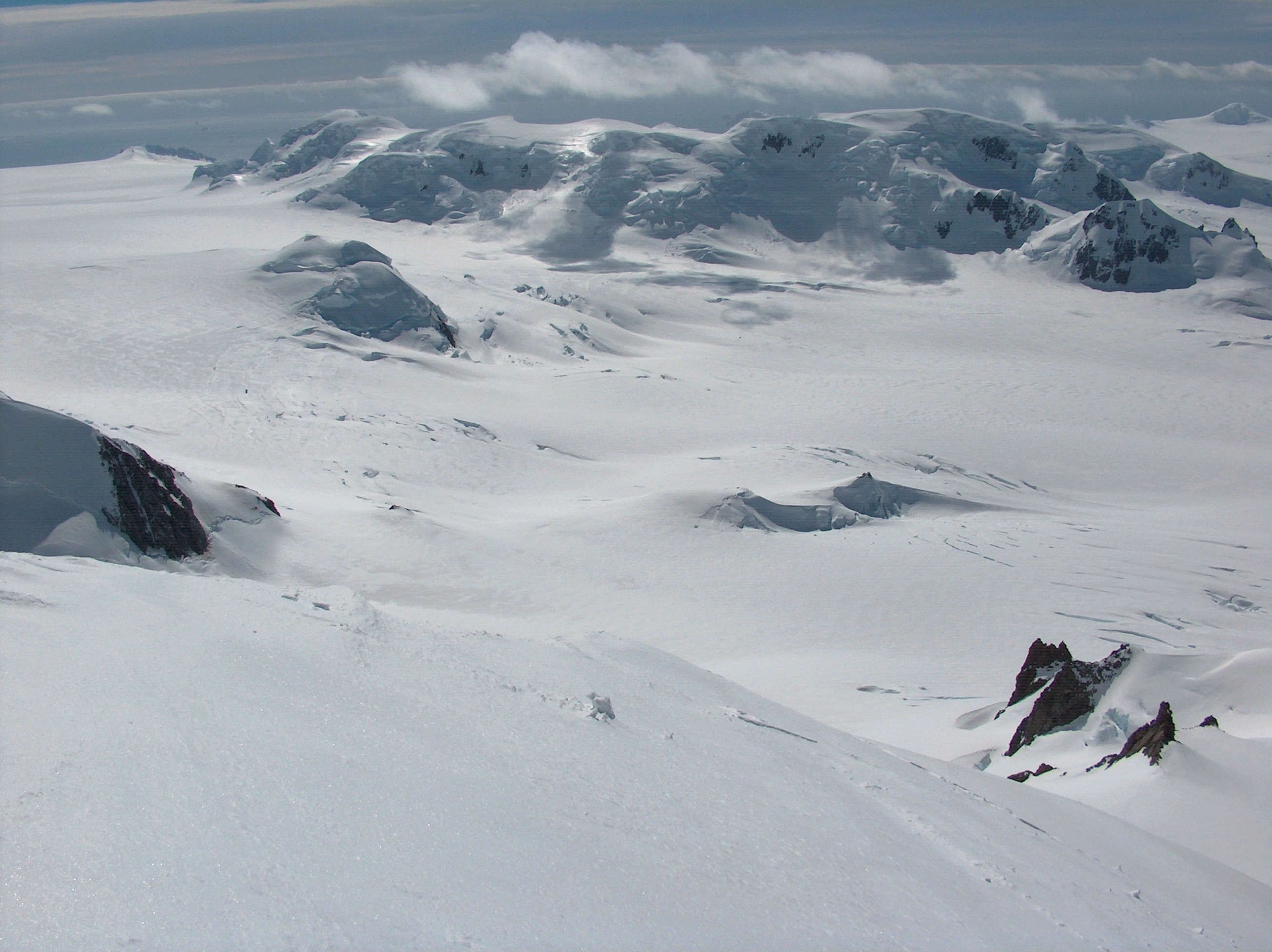
Upper Huron Glacier from Ongal Peak, with Kuzman Knoll and Bowles Ridge in the background

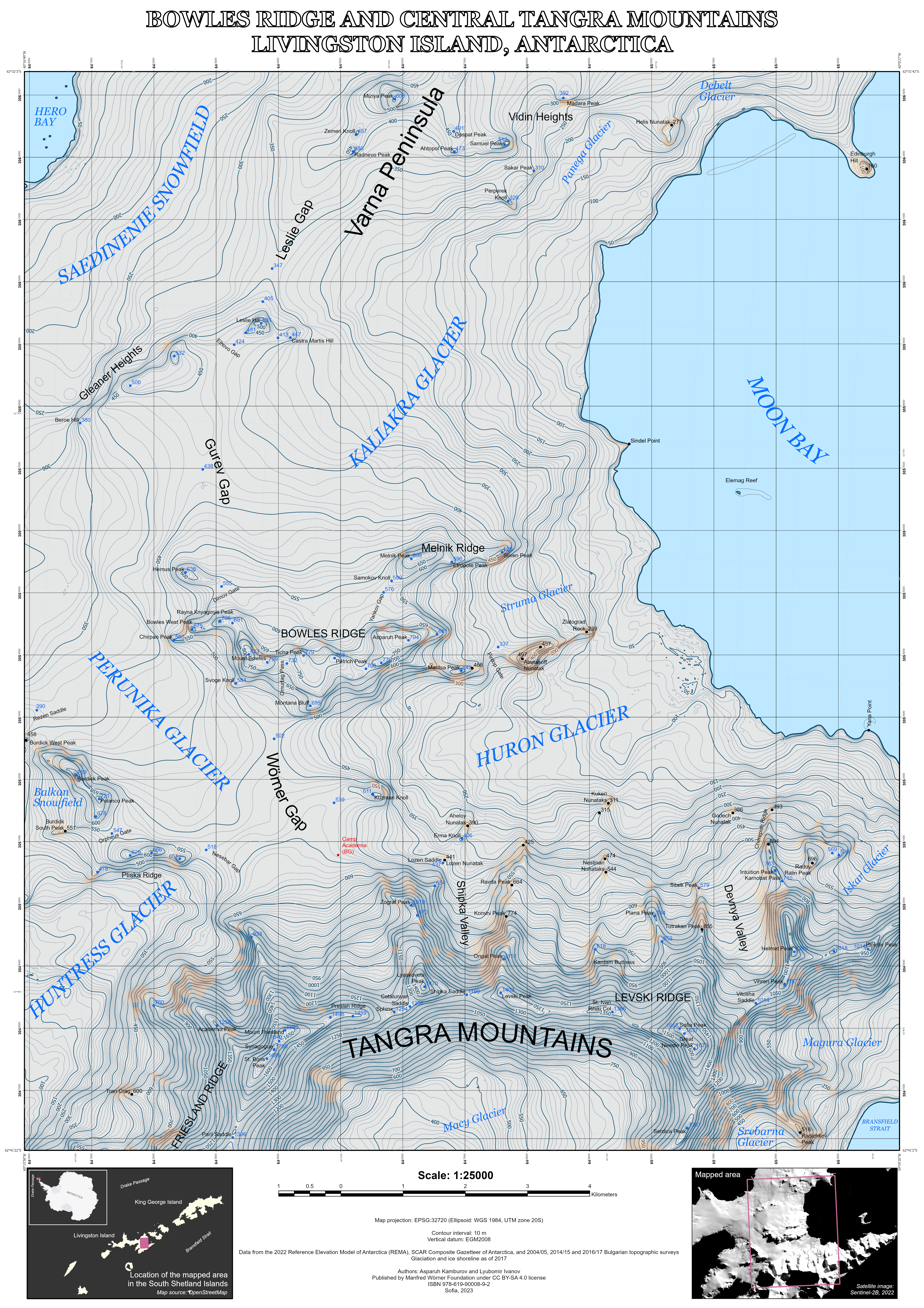
Topographic map of Bowles Ridge and central Tangra Mountains featuring Huron Glacier

Huron Glacier is a 4.8 nautical miles (8.9 km; 5.5 mi) long and 2.2 nautical miles (4.1 km; 2.5 mi) wide glacial flow on Livingston Island in the South Shetland Islands of Antarctica, situated east of Perunika Glacier, southeast of Kaliakra Glacier, south of Struma Glacier, west-northwest of Iskar Glacier and northeast of Huntress Glacier. It is bounded by Bowles Ridge to the north, Wörner Gap to the west and the Tangra Mountains to the south, receiving ice influx from several tributary glaciers draining the mountain's northern slopes between Mount Friesland and Helmet Peak, and running east-northeastwards to empty into Moon Bay north of Yana Point. Camp Academia is situated on upper Huron Glacier, in the northwestern foothills of Zograf Peak.

The glacier was named by the UK Antarctic Place-names Committee in 1958 after the American ship Huron (Captain John Davis) of New Haven, Connecticut, which visited the South Shetland Islands in 1820–21 and 1821–22.

== Location ==
Huron Glacier is centred at 62°37′50″S 60°06′50″W (British mapping in 1968, Bulgarian survey Tangra 2004/05 and mapping in 2005 and 2009).

== See also ==
- List of glaciers in the Antarctic
- Glaciology
- Camp Academia
- Tangra 2004/05

== Maps ==
- L.L. Ivanov et al. Antarctica: Livingston Island and Greenwich Island, South Shetland Islands. Scale 1:100000 topographic map. Sofia: Antarctic Place-names Commission of Bulgaria, 2005.
- L.L. Ivanov. Antarctica: Livingston Island and Greenwich, Robert, Snow and Smith Islands. Scale 1:120000 topographic map. Troyan: Manfred Wörner Foundation, 2009. ISBN 978-954-92032-6-4
- A. Kamburov and L. Ivanov. Bowles Ridge and Central Tangra Mountains: Livingston Island, Antarctica. Scale 1:25000 map. Sofia: Manfred Wörner Foundation, 2023. ISBN 978-619-90008-6-1
