= Iskar Glacier =

Glacier in Antarctica

- Location of Livingston Island in the South Shetland Islands

- Location within South Shetland Islands Location within Antarctica
- Location: Livingston Island
- Coordinates: 62°38′20″S 59°59′20″W
- Thickness: unknown
- Terminus: Bruix Cove
- Status: unknown

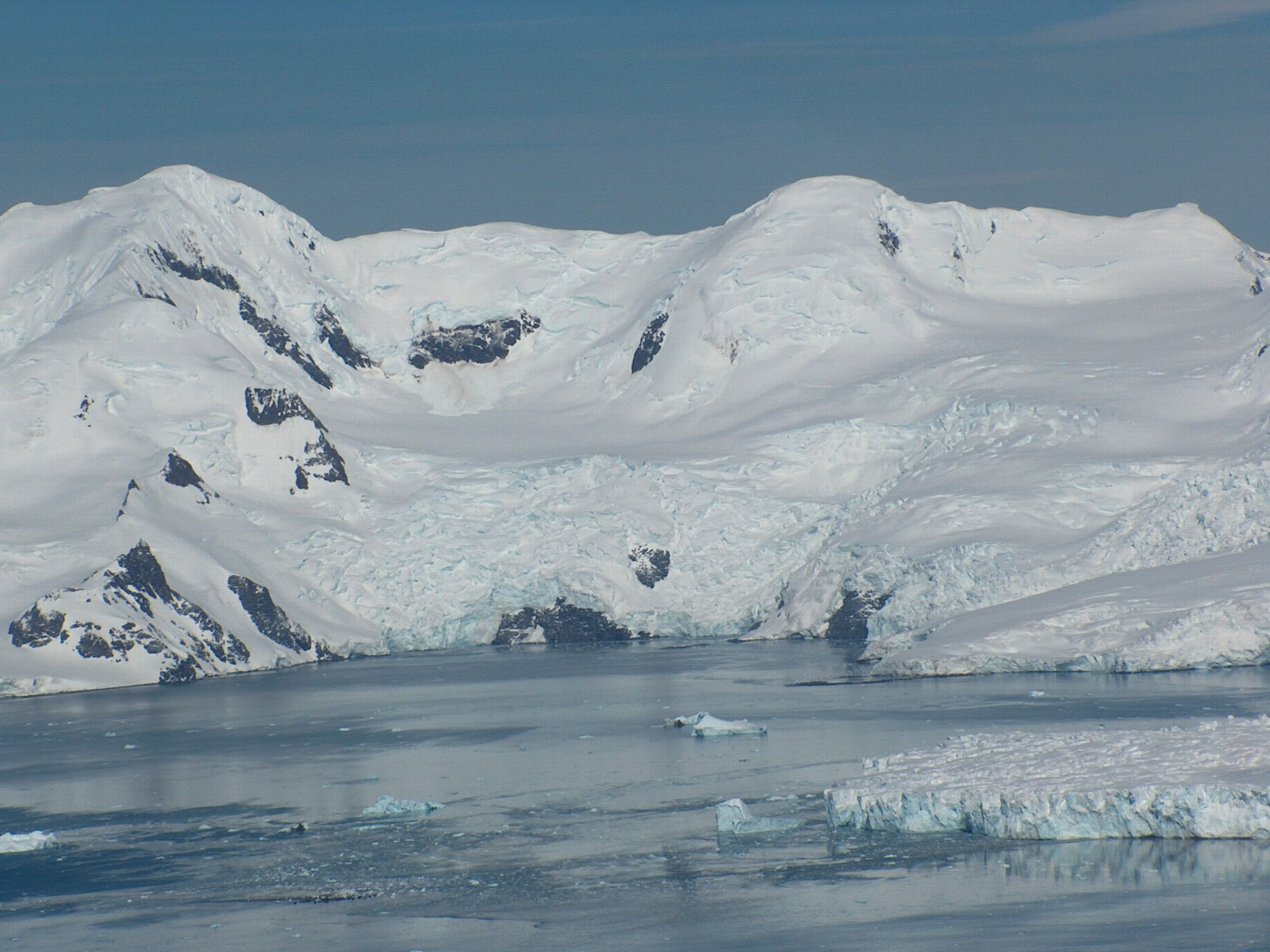
Iskar Glacier from Miziya Peak.

Topographic map of Livingston Island and Smith Island

Iskar Glacier (Bulgarian: Искарски ледник, romanized: Iskarski lednik, IPA: [ˈiskɐrski ˈlɛdnik]) is a glacier in Livingston Island, South Shetland Islands in Antarctica situated southeast of lower Huron Glacier, west-southwest of Sopot Ice Piedmont, and north of Dobrudzha and Magura Glaciers. It drains the north slopes of the Tangra Mountains between Helmet Peak to the west and Delchev Peak to the east, and flows northward into Bruix Cove between Yana Point and Rila Point.

The feature is named after the Iskar River in western Bulgaria.

== Location ==
Iskar Glacier is centred at 62°38′20″S 59°59′20″W. Bulgarian mapping in 2005 and 2009.

== See also ==
- List of glaciers in the Antarctic
- Glaciology

== Maps ==
- L.L. Ivanov et al. Antarctica: Livingston Island and Greenwich Island, South Shetland Islands. Scale 1:100000 topographic map. Sofia: Antarctic Place-names Commission of Bulgaria, 2005.
- L.L. Ivanov. Antarctica: Livingston Island and Greenwich, Robert, Snow and Smith Islands. Scale 1:120000 topographic map. Troyan: Manfred Wörner Foundation, 2009.
- A. Kamburov and L. Ivanov. Bowles Ridge and Central Tangra Mountains: Livingston Island, Antarctica. Scale 1:25000 map. Sofia: Manfred Wörner Foundation, 2023. ISBN 978-619-90008-6-1
