= Bransfield Strait =

Strait in Antarctica

- Fleet Sea
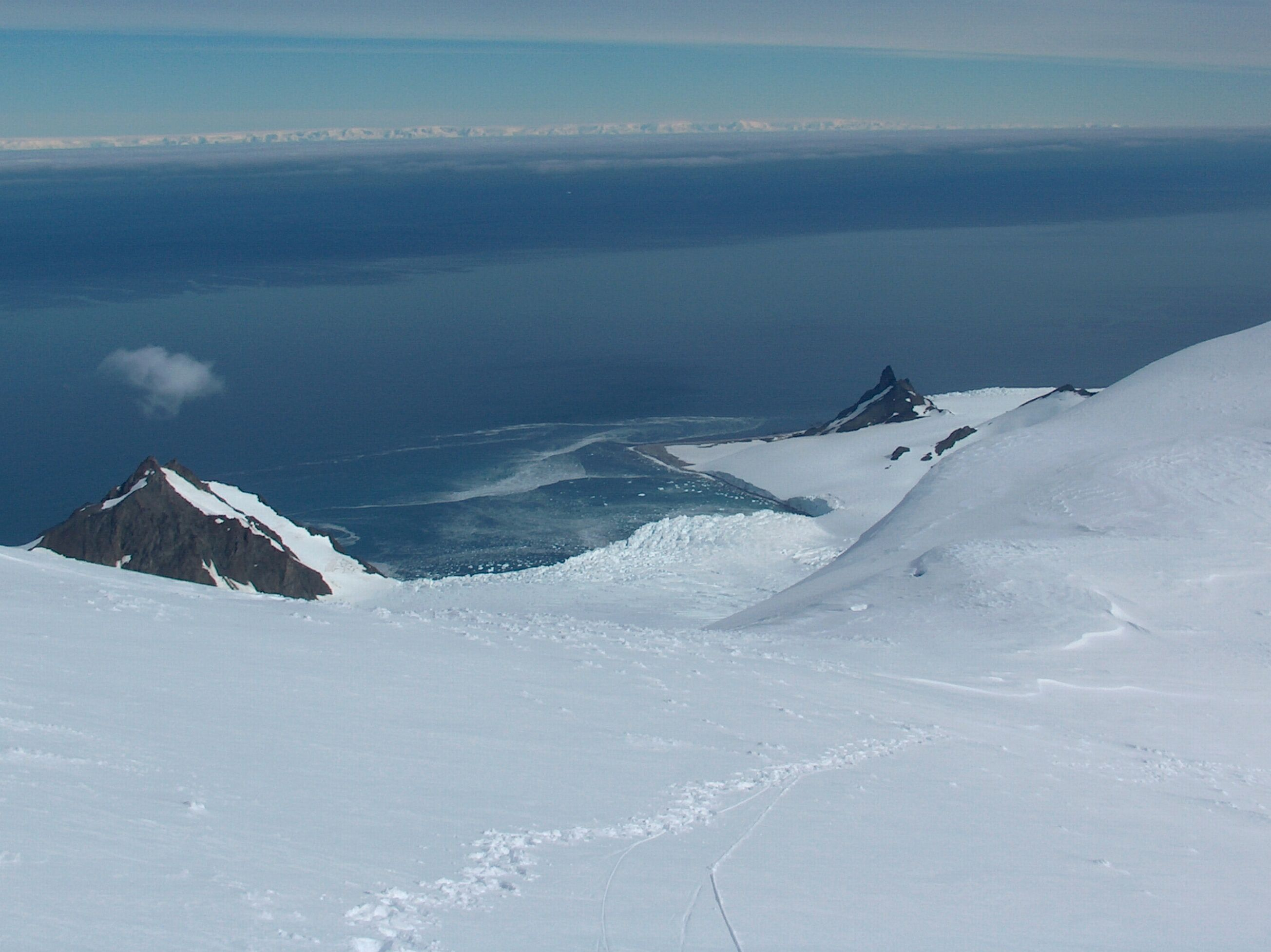
- The strait from Livingston Island, with Antarctic Peninsula seen on the horizon

- Location within Antarctic Peninsula Location within Antarctica
- Location: South Shetland Islands, Antarctica
- Coordinates: 63°S 59°W
- Etymology: Edward Bransfield, who chartered the South Shetland Islands
- Max. length: 300 miles (500 km)
- Max. width: 100 kilometres (60 mi)

Bransfield Strait or Fleet Sea (Spanish: Estrecho de Bransfield, Mar de la Flota) is a body of water about 100 kilometres (60 mi) wide extending for 300 miles (500 km) in a general northeast – southwest direction between the South Shetland Islands and the Antarctic Peninsula.

== History ==
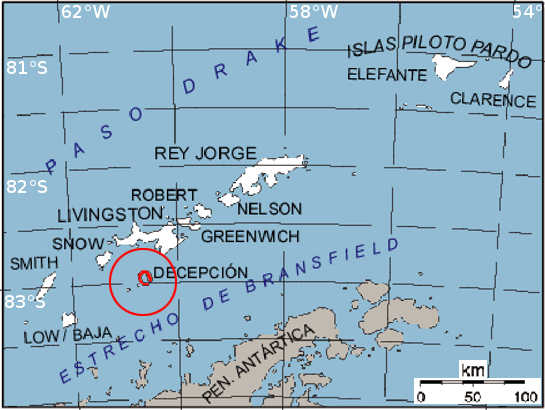
Location of the Bransfield Strait

The strait was named in about 1825 by James Weddell, Master, Royal Navy, for Edward Bransfield, Master, RN, who charted the South Shetland Islands in 1820. It is called Mar de la Flota by Argentina. On 23 November 2007, the MS Explorer struck an iceberg and sank in the strait; all 154 passengers were rescued and no injuries were reported.

== Description ==
The undersea trough through the strait is known as Bransfield Trough (61°30′S 54°0′W). The basin is about 400 km long and 2 km deep, between the South Shetland Island Arc and the Antarctic Peninsula. It was formed by rifting behind the islands, which began about 4 million years ago. Ongoing rifting has caused recent earthquakes and volcanism. The Strait hosts a chain of submerged seamounts of volcanic origin, including the presently inactive Orca Seamount. However last volcanic activity at Orca Seamount is judged to have occurred in the recent past as there are temperature anomalies in the seawater around the seamount. Thermophilic and hyperthermophilic microorganisms have been found at the seamount. Thermophiles found on the seafloor outside Orca Seamount may indicate that thermal waters of Orca Seamount may travel laterally through geological structures or that currents bring in thermal water from Deception Island, an active volcano.

=== Geographic features ===
Nomad Rock is an isolated rock in the strait, 5 nmi (9.3 km) off the north coast of Trinity Peninsula and 9 nmi (17 km) northeast of Cape Legoupil. So named by United Kingdom Antarctic Place-Names Committee (UK-APC) because of confusion about the identity of geographic points along this coast, and because of the wandering of features and names on charts of this vicinity.

The Zélée Rocks are a group of rocks, some of which are above water and others near the surface, lying in Bransfield Strait 17 nmi (31 km) north of Prime Head, the north tip of Antarctic Peninsula. They were discovered by the French expedition of 1837–40, under Captain Jules Dumont d'Urville, and named by him after one of the expedition's ships, the corvette Zélée.

== Antarctic Specially Protected Area ==
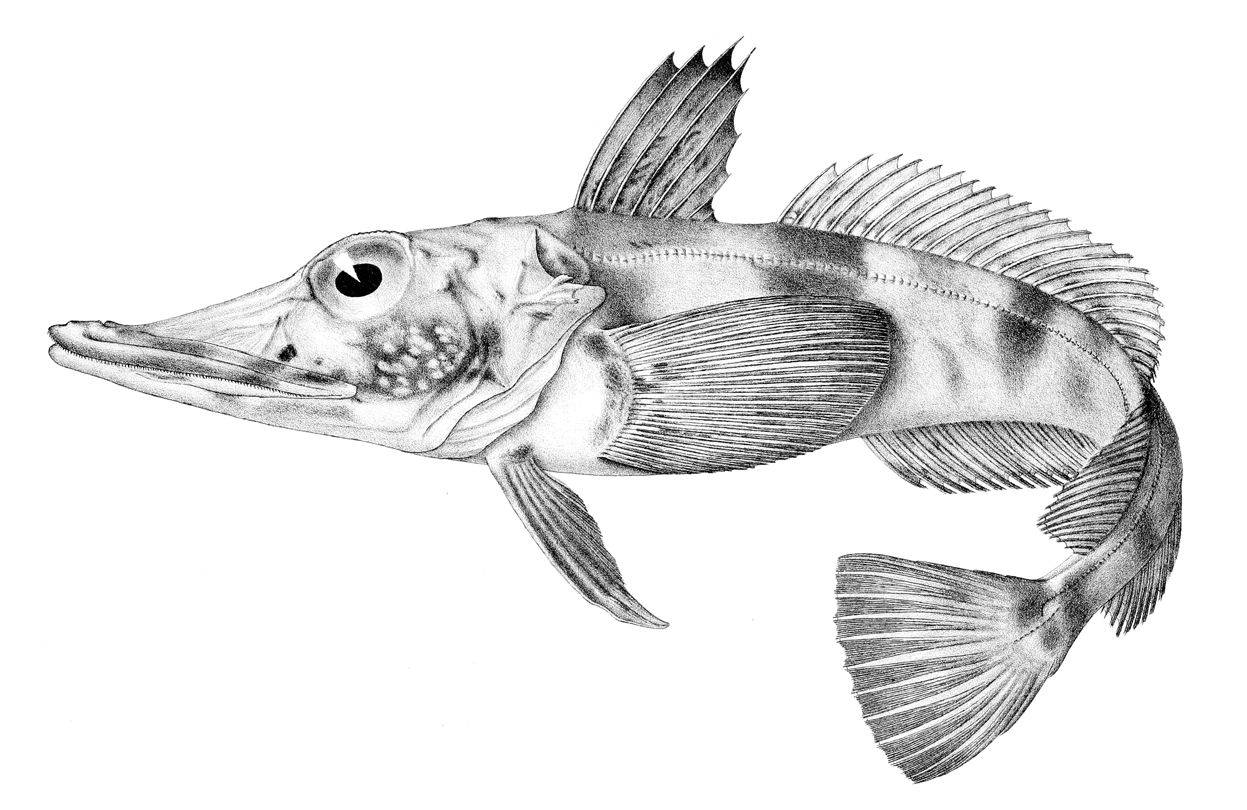
Blackfin Icefish

An area of relatively shallow marine waters of about 1021 km^{2}, off the western and southern coasts of Low Island, has been designated an Antarctic Specially Protected Area (ASPA 152) because it is one of only two known sites near the United States’s Palmer Station suitable for bottom trawling for fish and other benthic organisms. Fish have been collected from the site by scientists from Palmer Station since the early 1970s, and it is recognised as an important spawning ground for several species, including Black Rockcod and Blackfin Icefish.
