= Etropole Peak =

Location of Livingston Island in the South Shetland Islands.

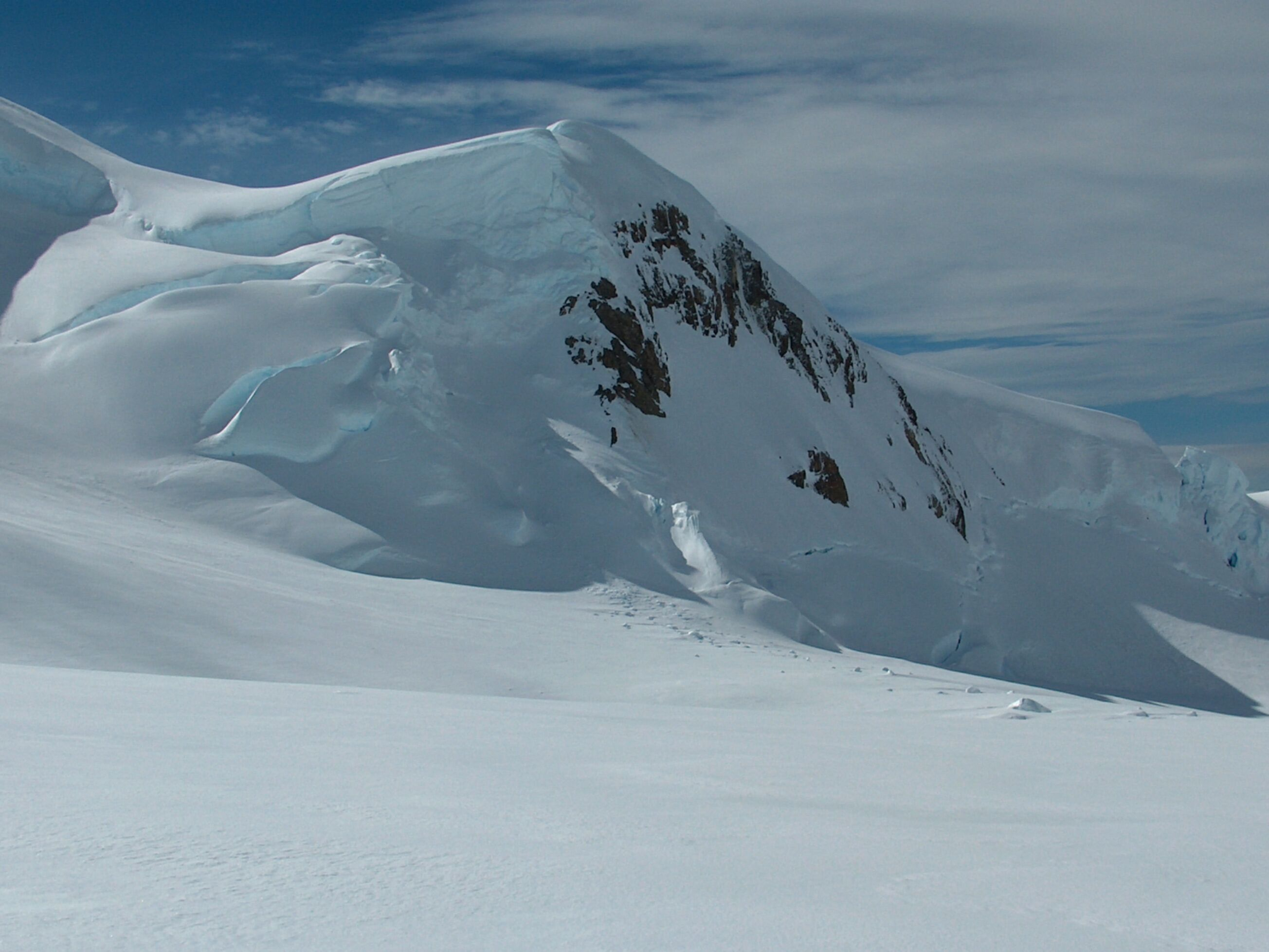
Etropole Peak from Struma Glacier.

Topographic map of Livingston Island, Greenwich, Robert, Snow and Smith Islands.

Etropole Peak (Bulgarian: връх Етрополе, romanized: vrah Etropole, IPA: [ˈvrɤx ˈɛtropolɛ]) is a 620m peak in Melnik Ridge, Livingston Island and is named after the town of Etropole in Central Bulgaria.

== Maps ==
- L.L. Ivanov et al. Antarctica: Livingston Island and Greenwich Island, South Shetland Islands. Scale 1:100000 topographic map. Sofia: Antarctic Place-names Commission of Bulgaria, 2005.
- L.L. Ivanov. Antarctica: Livingston Island and Greenwich, Robert, Snow and Smith Islands. Scale 1:120000 topographic map. Troyan: Manfred Wörner Foundation, 2009.
- A. Kamburov and L. Ivanov. Bowles Ridge and Central Tangra Mountains: Livingston Island, Antarctica. Scale 1:25000 map. Sofia: Manfred Wörner Foundation, 2023. ISBN 978-619-90008-6-1

== Location ==
The peak is located at 62°36′07″S 60°08′25″W which is 660 m east of Melnik Peak, 620 m west of Sliven Peak and 1.92 km northwest of Atanasoff Nunatak (Bulgarian mapping in 2005 and 2009 from the Tangra 2004/05 topographic survey).
