= Samokov Knoll =

Location of Livingston Island in the South Shetland Islands.

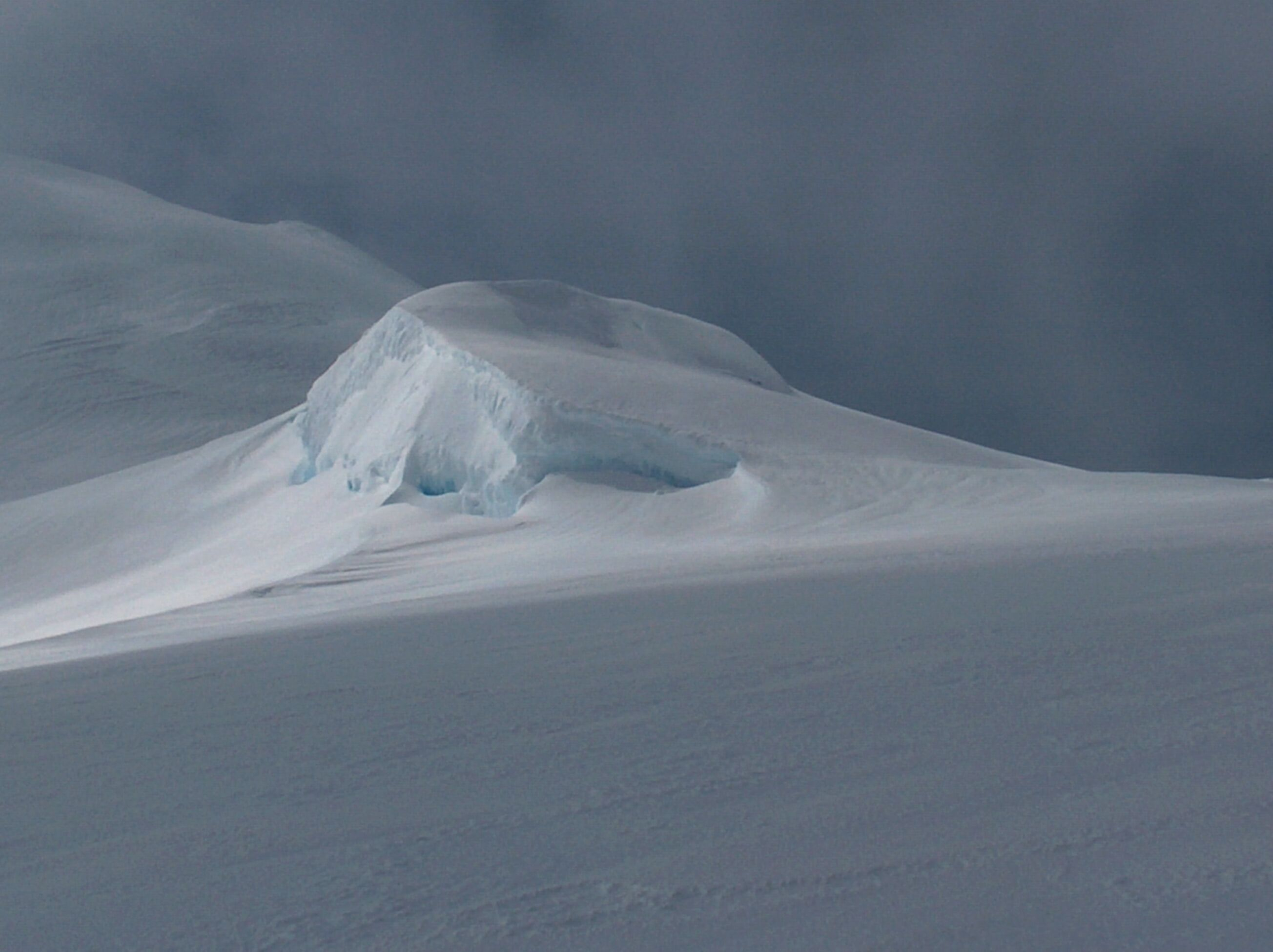
Samokov Knoll from Yankov Gap.

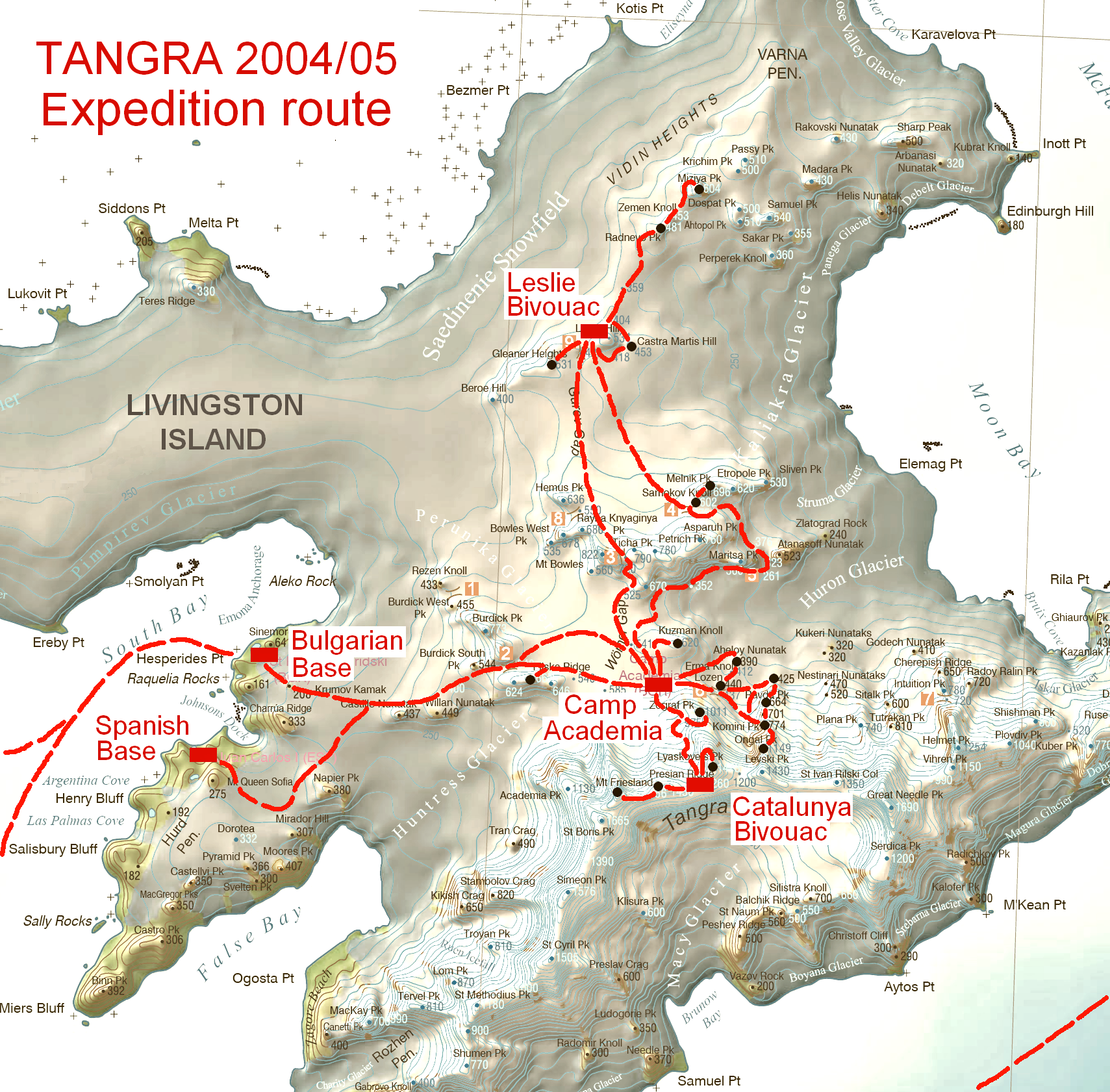
The survey route of Tangra 2004/05 including Samokov Knoll.

Topographic map of Livingston Island, Greenwich, Robert, Snow and Smith Islands.

Samokov Knoll (Samokovska Mogila \'sa-mo-kov-ska mo-'gi-la\) is a peak of elevation 602 m in Yankov Gap area, Livingston Island in the South Shetland Islands, Antarctica. Surmounting Kaliakra Glacier to the northwest and Struma Glacier to the southeast.

The peak was first visited by the Bulgarians Lyubomir Ivanov and Doychin Vasilev from Camp Academia on 28 December 2004, as part of Tangra 2004/05 survey, and is named after the town of Samokov in Southwestern Bulgaria.

== Location ==
The peak is located at 62°36′18″S 60°09′31.3″W which is 480 m southwest of Melnik Peak, 2.46 km northwest of Atanasoff Nunatak, 930 m north of Asparuh Peak, 3.18 km east of Hemus Peak and 4.66 km southeast of Leslie Hill (Bulgarian topographic survey Tangra 2004/05, and mapping in 2005 and 2009).

== Maps ==
- L.L. Ivanov et al. Antarctica: Livingston Island and Greenwich Island, South Shetland Islands. Scale 1:100000 topographic map. Sofia: Antarctic Place-names Commission of Bulgaria, 2005.
- L.L. Ivanov. Antarctica: Livingston Island and Greenwich, Robert, Snow and Smith Islands. Scale 1:120000 topographic map. Troyan: Manfred Wörner Foundation, 2009. ISBN 978-954-92032-6-4
