= Zlatograd Rock =

Rocky peak in the South Shetland Islands, Antarctica

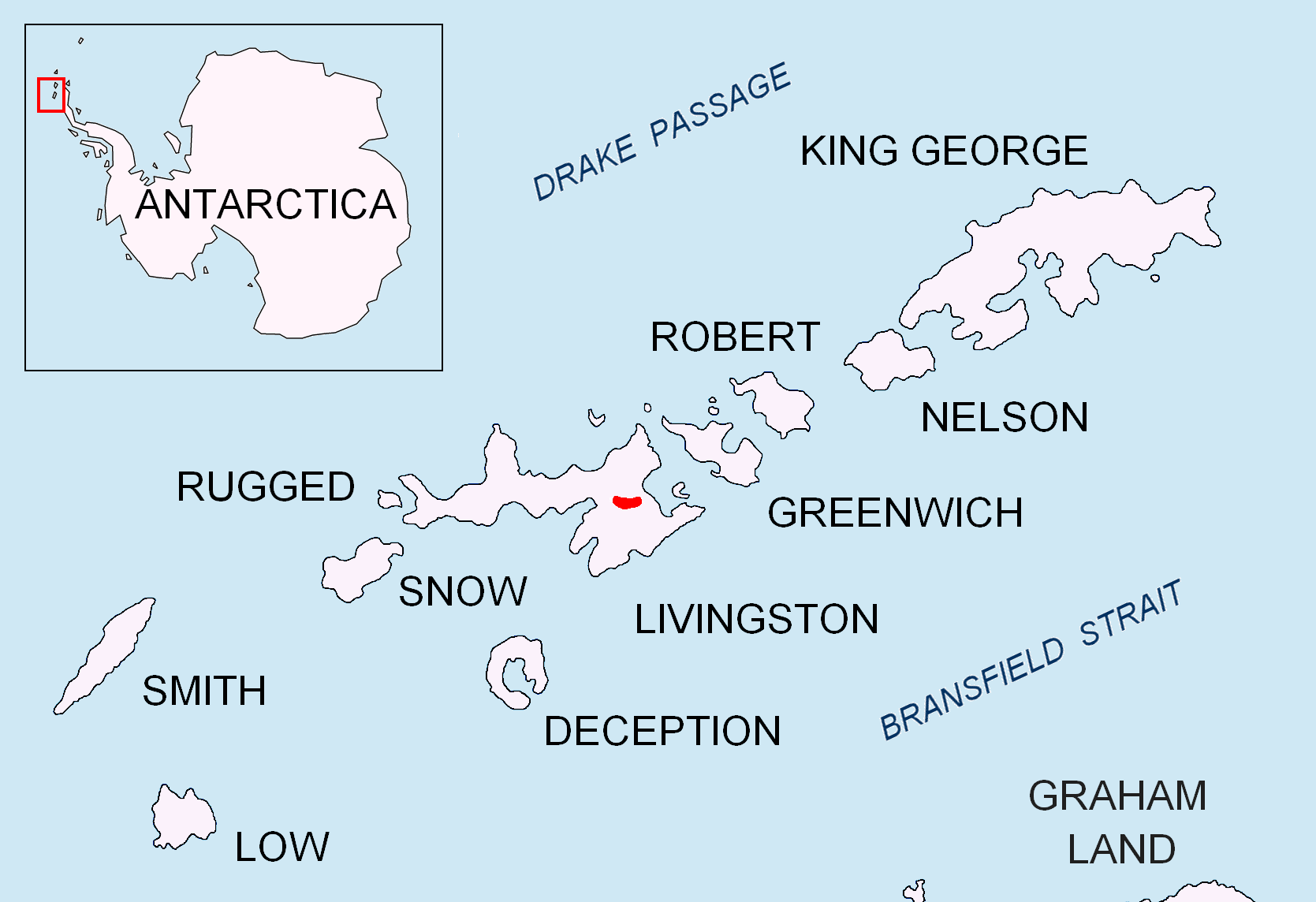
Location of Bowles Ridge on Livingston Island in the South Shetland Islands.

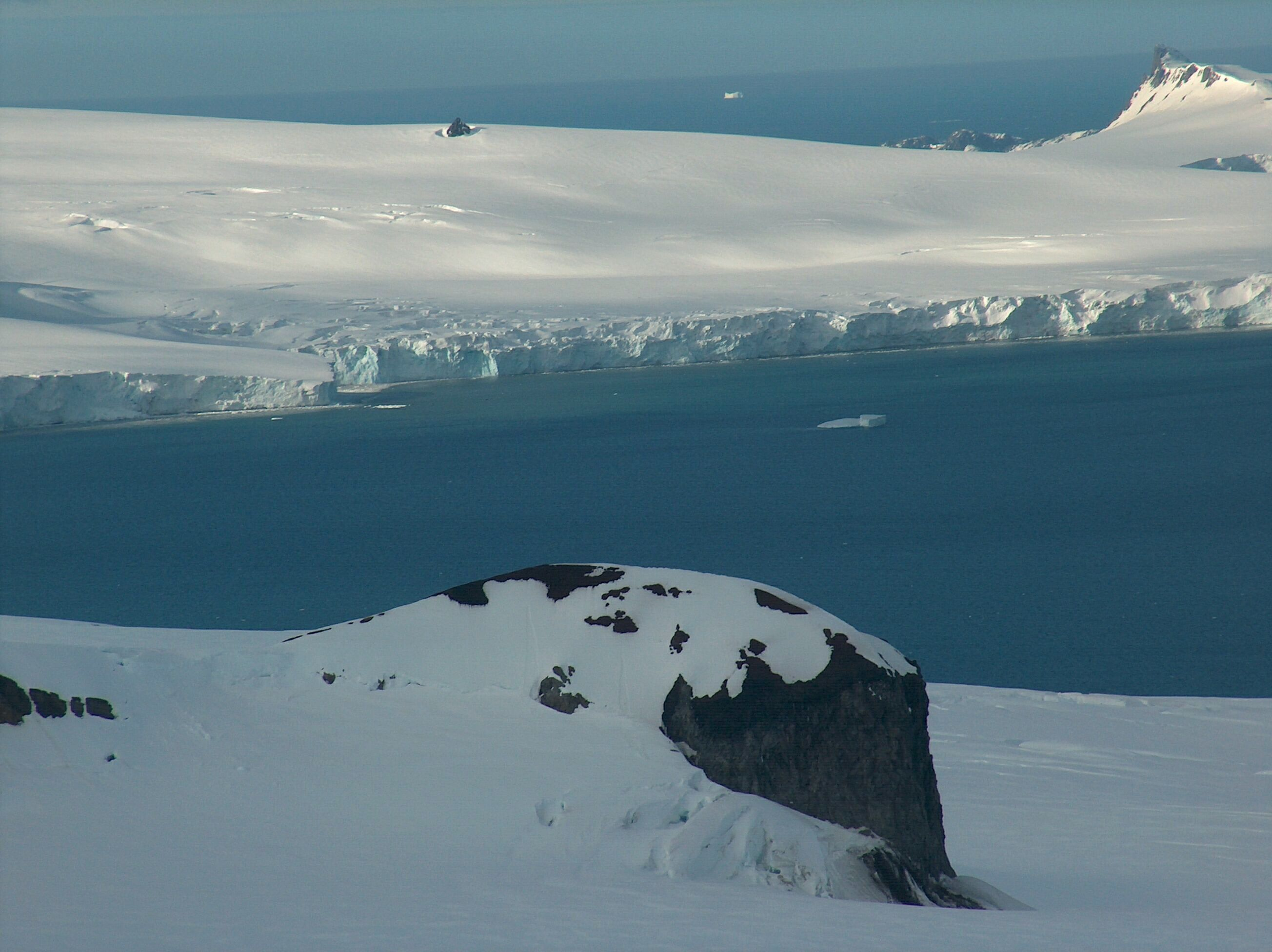
Zlatograd Rock from Shipka Valley.

Topographic map of Livingston Island and Smith Island

Zlatograd Rock (Zlatogradski Kamak \zla-to-'grad-ski 'ka-m&k\) is a rocky 240 m peak forming the eastern extremity of Bowles Ridge, Livingston Island in the South Shetland Islands, Antarctica. The peak overlooks Struma Glacier to the northwest and Huron Glacier to the southeast. It is named after the town of Zlatograd in the Rhodope Mountains, Southern Bulgaria.

== Location ==
The peak is located at 62°36′39.4″S 60°05′50″W, which is 1.06 km east-northeast of Atanasoff Nunatak, 1.94 km southeast of Sliven Peak, 3.11 km south of Sindel Point, 4.7 km northwest of Yana Point and 3.7 km northwest of Godech Nunatak.

First mapped from the Bulgarian topographic survey Tangra 2004/05.

== Maps ==
- L.L. Ivanov et al. Antarctica: Livingston Island and Greenwich Island, South Shetland Islands. Scale 1:100000 topographic map. Sofia: Antarctic Place-names Commission of Bulgaria, 2005.
- L.L. Ivanov. Antarctica: Livingston Island and Greenwich, Robert, Snow and Smith Islands. Scale 1:120000 topographic map. Troyan: Manfred Wörner Foundation, 2010. ISBN 978-954-92032-9-5 (First edition 2009. ISBN 978-954-92032-6-4)
- Antarctic Digital Database (ADD). Scale 1:250000 topographic map of Antarctica. Scientific Committee on Antarctic Research (SCAR). Since 1993, regularly updated.
- L.L. Ivanov. Antarctica: Livingston Island and Smith Island. Scale 1:100000 topographic map. Manfred Wörner Foundation, 2017. ISBN 978-619-90008-3-0
- A. Kamburov and L. Ivanov. Bowles Ridge and Central Tangra Mountains: Livingston Island, Antarctica. Scale 1:25000 map. Sofia: Manfred Wörner Foundation, 2023. ISBN 978-619-90008-6-1
