= Tran dialect =

Dialect of Bulgarian

The Tran dialect is a Bulgarian dialect, member of the Transitional dialects, which is spoken in the regions of Tran and Godech in central western Bulgaria and in the Western Outlands. It borders on the Belogradchik dialect to the north, the Sofia dialect to the east and the Breznik dialect to the south.

== Phonological and morphological characteristics ==
- The reflexes of Old Bulgarian ръ/рь and лъ/ль are either vocalic r and l or ър (ər) and лъ(lə), depending on individual words and subdialects: крв but кърстът (blood, the cross) vs. Standard Bulgarian кръв, кръстът and жлт/жлът vs. Standard Bulgarian жълт (yellow)
- Triple definite article (as in the Rhodopean Smolyan dialect): -ът, -та, -то, -те/та for general cases, -ъв, -ва, -во, -ве/ва for objects situated close to the speaker and -ън, -на, -но, -не/на for objects situated far from the speaker. The -ъв/-ън forms have now become obsolete
- Doubling of the definite article for feminine nouns ending on a consonant (as in the Gabrovo subdialect of the Central Balkan dialect): памет->паметуту vs. Standard Bulgarian памет->паметта (memory->the memory)

For other phonological and morphological characteristics typical for all Transitional dialects, cf. Transitional Bulgarian dialects.

== Sources ==
Стойков, Стойко: Българска диалектология, Акад. изд. "Проф. Марин Дринов", 2006
