= Sitalk Peak =

Rocky peak in South Shetland Islands, Antarctica

Location of Tangra Mountains on Livingston Island in the South Shetland Islands.

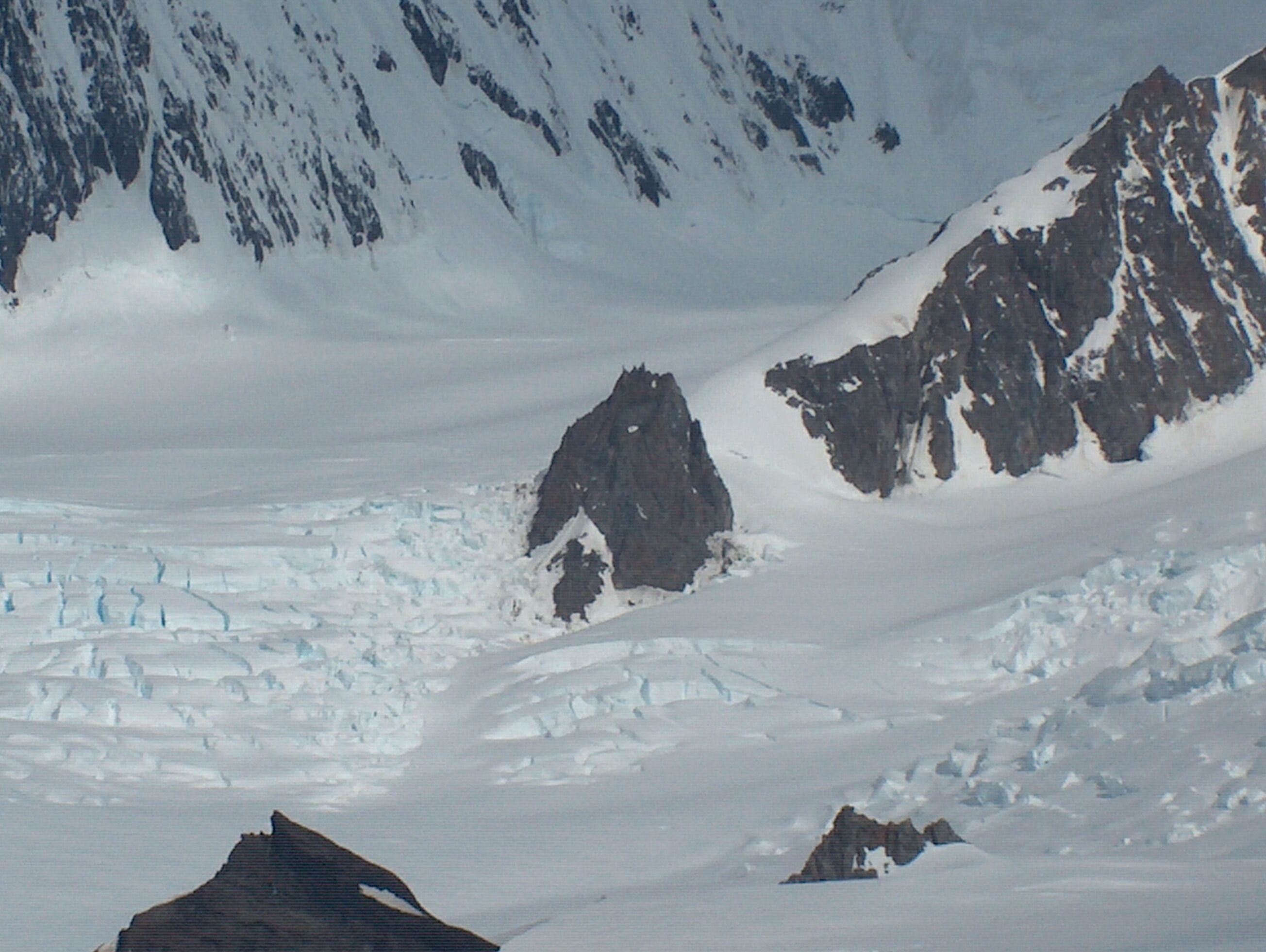
Sitalk Peak from the southern foothills of Petrich Peak, with Kukeri Nunataks in the foreground.

Topographic map of Livingston Island, Greenwich, Robert, Snow and Smith Islands.

Sitalk Peak (Bulgarian: връх Ситалк, romanized: vrah Sitalk, IPA: [ˈvrɤx siˈtaɫk]) is a rocky peak of elevation 600 m in Levski Ridge, Tangra Mountains, Livingston Island in the South Shetland Islands, Antarctica. Situated at the end of a side ridge running northwards from Great Needle Peak, and linked to a rocky part of that ridge featuring Tutrakan Peak to the south by a 100-metre long ice-covered saddle. Surmounting Huron Glacier and its tributaries to the north, east and west. The peak is named after the Thracian King Sitalk, 431-424 BC.

== Location ==
The peak is located at 62°38′49.7″S 60°03′38″W, which is 700 m north of Tutrakan Peak, 750 m northeast of Plana Peak, 1.46 km east of Nestinari Nunataks, 1.93 km southeast of Kukeri Nunataks and 1.34 km west-southwest of Intuition Peak (Bulgarian topographic survey Tangra 2004/05, and mapping in 2005 and 2009).

== Maps ==
- L.L. Ivanov et al. Antarctica: Livingston Island and Greenwich Island, South Shetland Islands. Scale 1:100000 topographic map. Sofia: Antarctic Place-names Commission of Bulgaria, 2005.
- L.L. Ivanov. Antarctica: Livingston Island and Greenwich, Robert, Snow and Smith Islands. Scale 1:120000 topographic map. Troyan: Manfred Wörner Foundation, 2009. ISBN 978-954-92032-6-4
- A. Kamburov and L. Ivanov. Bowles Ridge and Central Tangra Mountains: Livingston Island, Antarctica. Scale 1:25000 map. Sofia: Manfred Wörner Foundation, 2023. ISBN 978-619-90008-6-1
