= Asparuh Peak =

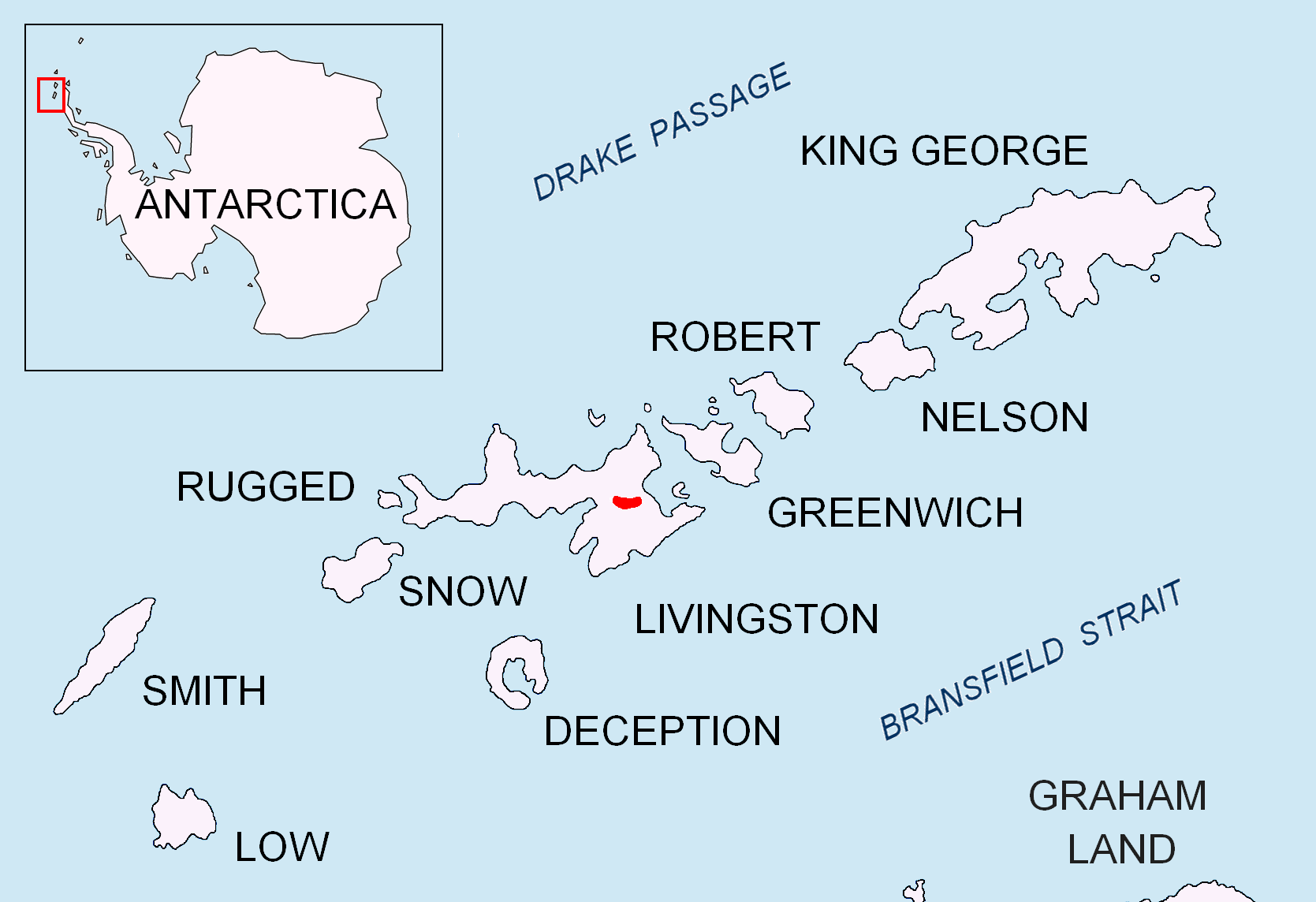
Location of Bowles Ridge on Livingston Island in the South Shetland Islands.

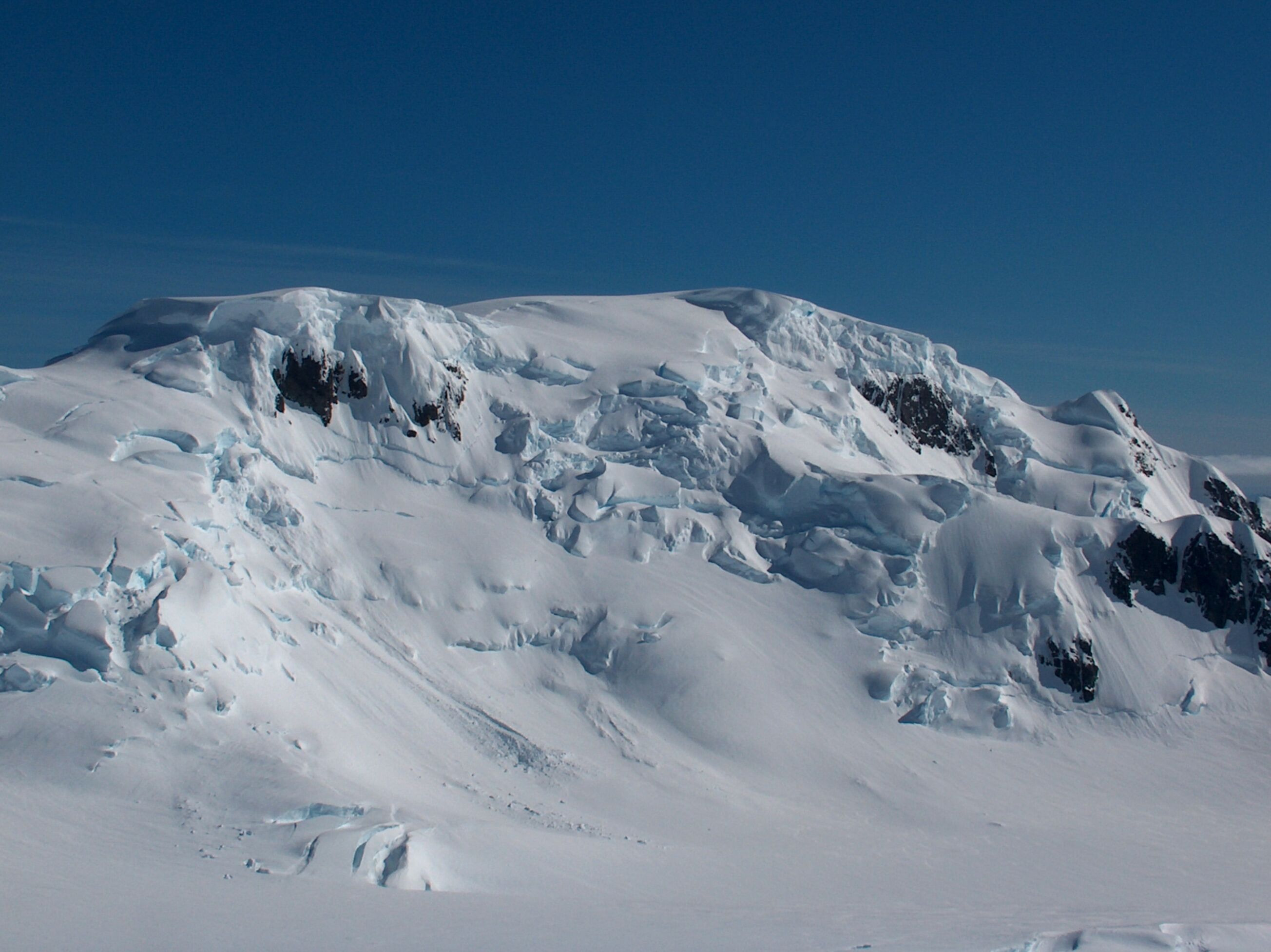
Asparuh Peak

Topographic map of Livingston Island, Greenwich, Robert, Snow and Smith Islands.

Asparuh Peak (Bulgarian: Аспарухов връх, romanized: Asparuhov vrah, IPA: [ɐspɐˈruxov ˈvrɤx]) is a peak situated on Livingston Island, Antarctica. The peak rises to 760m in Bowles Ridge and is linked to the Melnik Ridge by the 575m high Yankov Gap. It was named after Khan Asparuh of Bulgaria, 668-700 AD, who incorporated by treaty the territory between the Balkan Mountains and the Danube in 681 AD.

== Location ==
The peak is located at 62°36′47″S 60°09′14″W which is 2.52 km east of the Mount Bowles, 1.26 km south of Melnik Peak and 1.96 km west of Atanasoff Nunatak.

== See also ==
- List of Bulgarian toponyms in Antarctica
- Antarctic Place-names Commission

== Maps ==
- L.L. Ivanov et al. Antarctica: Livingston Island and Greenwich Island, South Shetland Islands. Scale 1:100000 topographic map. Sofia: Antarctic Place-names Commission of Bulgaria, 2005.
- L.L. Ivanov. Antarctica: Livingston Island and Greenwich, Robert, Snow and Smith Islands. Scale 1:120000 topographic map. Troyan: Manfred Wörner Foundation, 2009.
- A. Kamburov and L. Ivanov. Bowles Ridge and Central Tangra Mountains: Livingston Island, Antarctica. Scale 1:25000 map. Sofia: Manfred Wörner Foundation, 2023. ISBN 978-619-90008-6-1
