= Yankov =

Yankov (Bulgarian: Янков) is a Bulgarian masculine surname, its feminine counterpart is Yankova. It may refer to:

- Chavdar Yankov (born 1984), Bulgarian football player
- Ivan Yankov (born 1951), Bulgarian wrestler
- Petko Yankov (born 1977), Bulgarian sprinter
- Radoslav Yankov (born 1990), Bulgarian snowboarder
- Radoslava Mavrodieva-Yankova (born 1987), Bulgarian shot putter
- Ventsislav Yankov (1926–2022), Bulgarian pianist and pedagogue
- Zlatko Yankov (born 1966), Bulgarian football manager and former player

== See also ==
- Yankov Gap
