= Kukeri Nunataks =

Nunataks on Livingston Island, Antarctica

Location of Tangra Mountains on Livingston Island in the South Shetland Islands

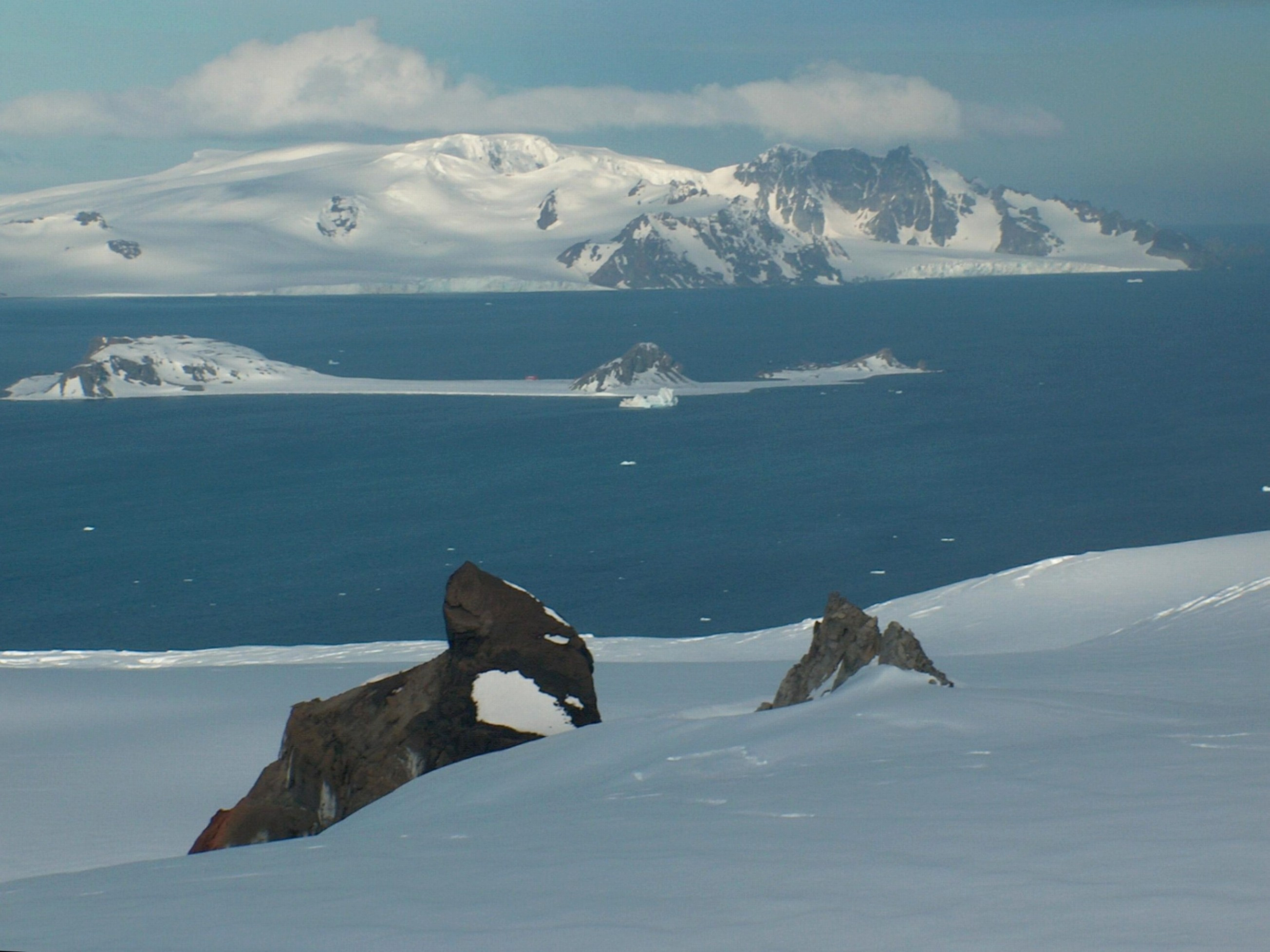
Kukeri Nunataks from the north foothills of Ravda Peak

Topographic map of Livingston Island and Smith Island

The Kukeri Nunataks (Kukerski Nunatatsi \'ku-ker-ski 'nu-na-ta-tsi\) are two rocky peaks with an elevation of 320 metres (1,050 ft), on Huron Glacier, Livingston Island, off West Antarctica. The Kukeri Nunataks are situated in the north foothills of the Tangra Mountains, 200 metre away from each other.

Nunatuk is originally an Inuit word referring to rocky peaks amid ice/snow, while Kukeri are costumed and masked figures (i.e. mummers) who appear in folk rituals and folklore in Bulgaria.

The larger northeastern peak is located at 62°38′07.7″S 60°05′18″W which is 3.76 km east of Kuzman Knoll, 890 m north of Nestinari Nunataks, 2.68 km south-southeast of Atanasoff Nunatak and 1.97 km west of Godech Nunatak (Bulgarian mapping in 2005 and 2009 from the Tangra 2004/05 topographic survey).

== Maps ==
- L.L. Ivanov et al. Antarctica: Livingston Island and Greenwich Island, South Shetland Islands. Scale 1:100000 topographic map. Sofia: Antarctic Place-names Commission of Bulgaria, 2005.
- L.L. Ivanov. Antarctica: Livingston Island and Greenwich, Robert, Snow and Smith Islands. Scale 1:120000 topographic map. Troyan: Manfred Wörner Foundation, 2009. ISBN 978-954-92032-6-4
- A. Kamburov and L. Ivanov. Bowles Ridge and Central Tangra Mountains: Livingston Island, Antarctica. Scale 1:25000 map. Sofia: Manfred Wörner Foundation, 2023. ISBN 978-619-90008-6-1
