= Breznik dialect =

Dialect of Bulgarian

The Breznik dialect is a Bulgarian dialect, member of the Transitional dialects, which is spoken in the region of Graovo in central western Bulgaria. It borders on the Tran dialect to the west and north, the Kyustendil dialect to the south and the Sofia dialect to the northeast and features characteristics typical for the Southwestern Bulgarian dialects.

== Phonological and morphological characteristics ==
- шч/дж (ʃt͡ʃ/d͡ʒ) for Proto-Slavic *tʲ/*dʲ: лешча, меджу vs. Standard Bulgarian леща, между (lentils, between).
- Vocalic r and l for Old Bulgarian ръ/рь and лъ/ль instead of the combinations ръ/ър (rə/ər) and лъ/ъл (lə/əl) in Standard Bulgarian - дрво, слза instead of дърво, сълза (tree, tear). However, the reflex of лъ/ль is u before labial consonants (as in the Ihtiman dialect and the Samokov dialect): вуна vs. formal Bulgarian вълна (wool)
- Definite articles -ът, -та, -то, -те as in Standard Bulgarian
- Vowel -e instead of -x in the forms of past imperfect tense: биее vs. Standard Bulgarian биех (I was beating)

The dialect is dynamic and is well known for the shortening of the words.

For other phonological and morphological characteristics typical for all Transitional dialects, cf. Transitional Bulgarian dialects.

== Sources ==
Стойков, Стойко: Българска диалектология, Акад. изд. "Проф. Марин Дринов", 2006
