= Yankov Gap =

Saddle on Livingston Island, Antarctica

Location of Livingston Island in the South Shetland Islands.

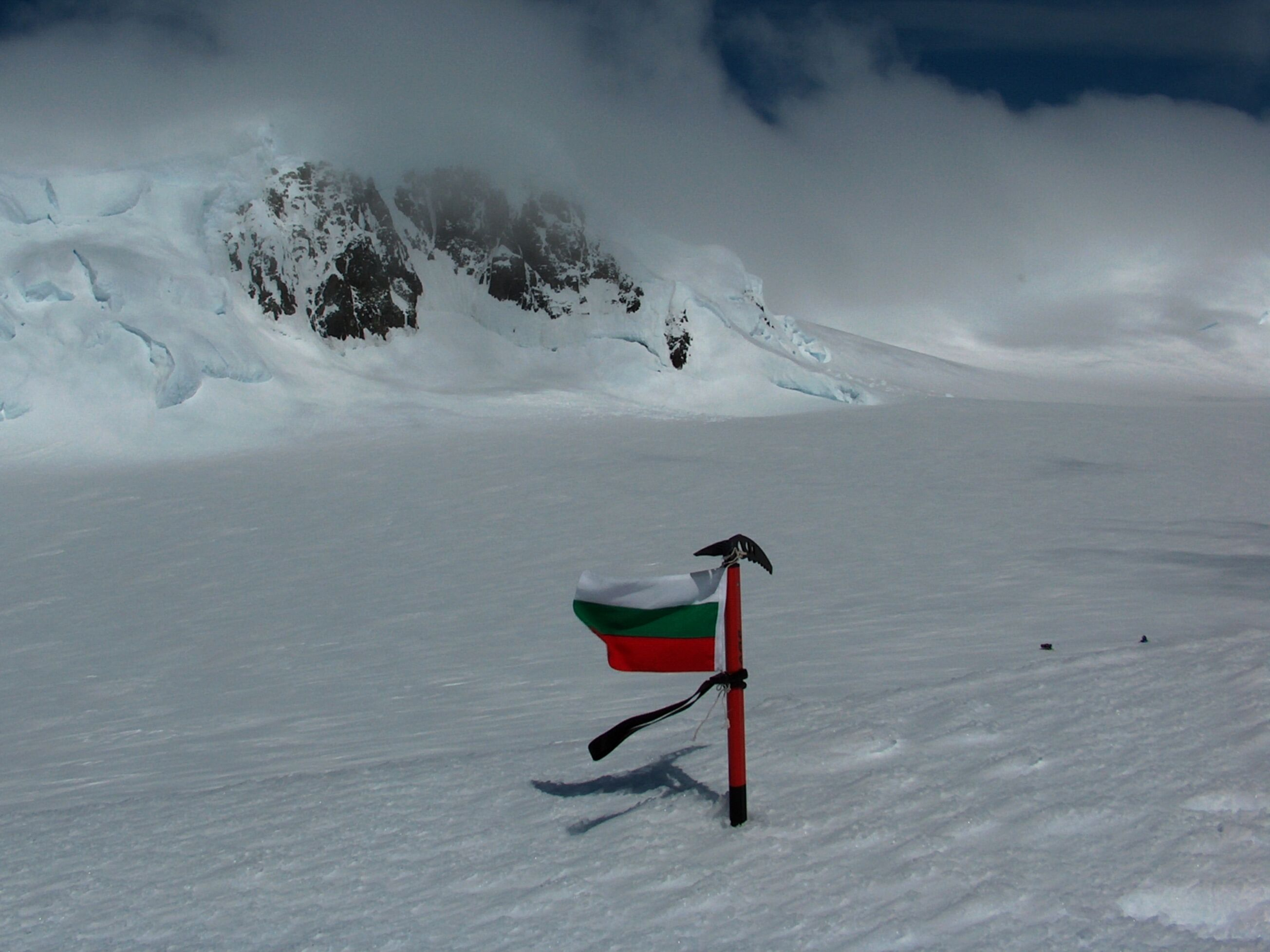
Yankov Gap from Melnik Peak, with Asparuh Peak in the background.

Topographic map of Livingston Island and Smith Island.

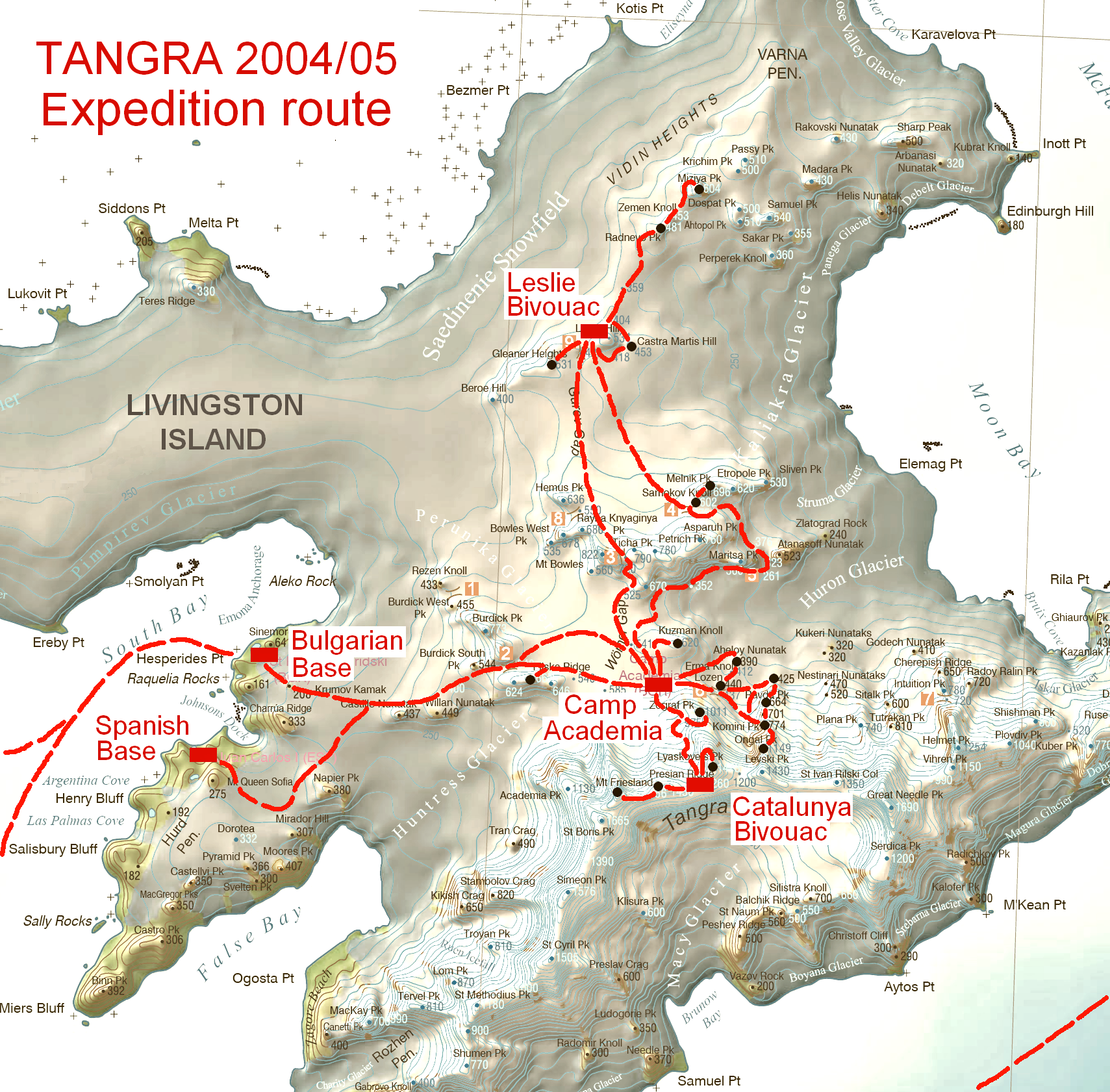
Tangra 2004/05 survey route including Yankov Gap.

Yankov Gap (Yankova Sedlovina \'yan-ko-va se-dlo-vi-'na\) is an ice-covered saddle linking Melnik Ridge and Bowles Ridge in eastern Livingston Island in the South Shetland Islands, Antarctica. The gap is at an elevation of 575 m and extends 1 km in the north-south direction from Samokov Knoll in Melnik Ridge to Asparuh Peak in Bowles Ridge. Yankov Gap is part of the divide between the glacial catchments of the head of Kaliakra Glacier to the west and Struma Glacier to the east.

The gap was first crossed by the Bulgarians Lyubomir Ivanov and Doychin Vasilev from Camp Academia on 28 December 2004. Named after Yordan Yankov, a radio-engineer at St. Kliment Ohridski Base in several seasons since 1995.

== Location ==
The gap's midpoint is located at 62°36′28″S 60°09′48″W, which is 1.99 km northwest of Pirdop Gate, 1.78 km east-northeast of Omurtag Pass and 4.76 km southeast of Elhovo Gap (Mapped in 2005 and 2009 from the Bulgarian topographic survey Tangra 2004/05).

== Maps ==
- L. Ivanov, N. Glavinchev, R. Tosheva and S. Naydenov. Antarctica: Livingston Island and Greenwich Island, South Shetland Islands (from English Strait to Morton Strait, with illustrations and ice-cover distribution). Scale 1:100000 topographic map. Antarctic Place-names Commission of Bulgaria. Sofia, 2005
- L.L. Ivanov. Antarctica: Livingston Island and Greenwich, Robert, Snow and Smith Islands. Scale 1:120000 topographic map. Troyan: Manfred Wörner Foundation, 2009. ISBN 978-954-92032-6-4
- A. Kamburov and L. Ivanov. Bowles Ridge and Central Tangra Mountains: Livingston Island, Antarctica. Scale 1:25000 map. Sofia: Manfred Wörner Foundation, 2023. ISBN 978-619-90008-6-1
