= Sliven Peak =

Mountain in Antarctica

Location of Livingston Island in the South Shetland Islands.

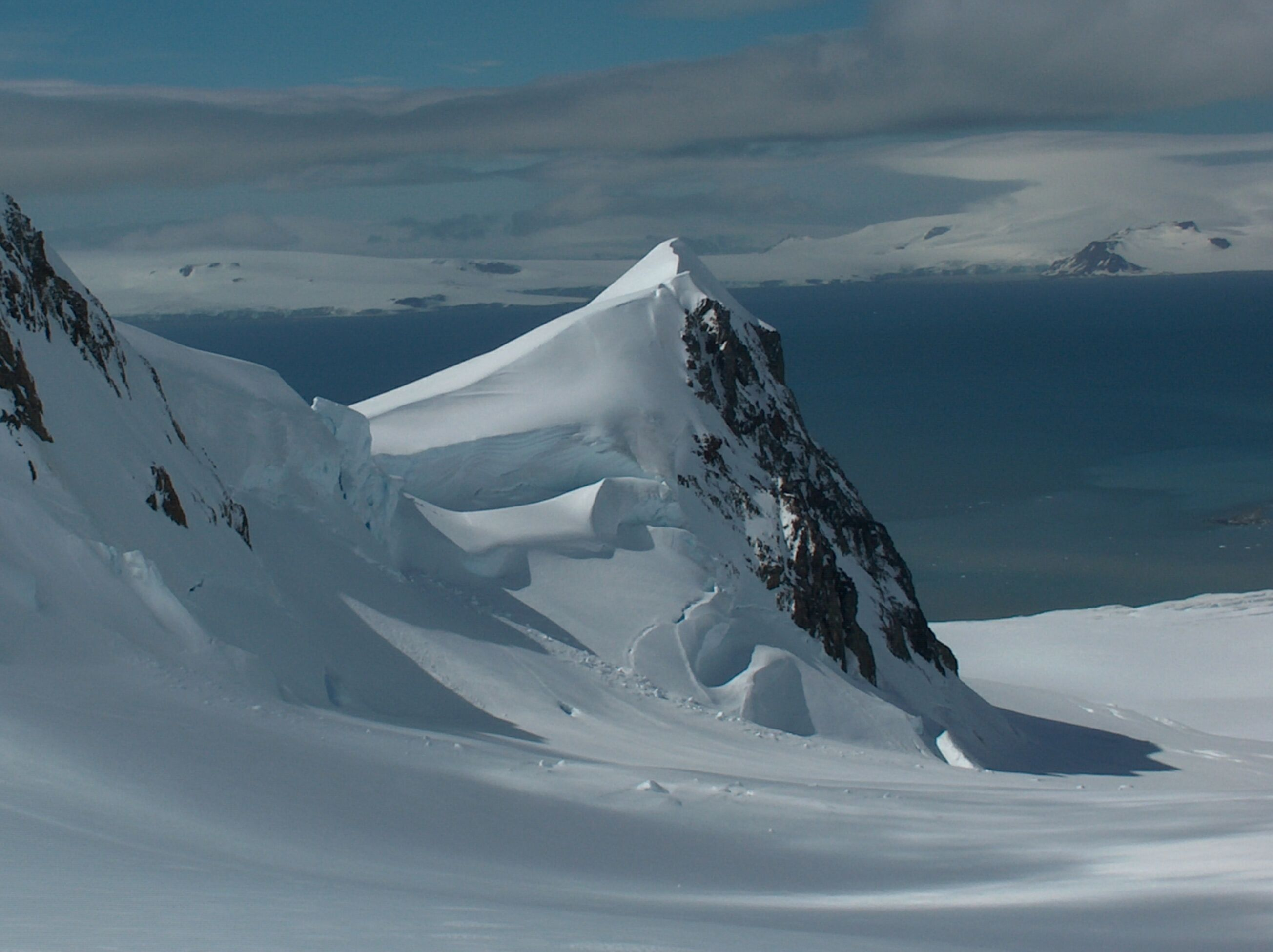
Sliven Peak from upper Struma Glacier.

Topographic map of Livingston Island and Smith Island

Sliven Peak (Bulgarian: връх Сливен, romanized: vrah Sliven, IPA: [ˈvrɤx ˈslivɛn]) rises to 530 m in the east extremity of Melnik Ridge, Livingston Island in the South Shetland Islands, Antarctica. The peak has precipitous rocky southern slopes and partly ice-free northern slopes, overlooking Kaliakra Glacier to the northwest and Struma Glacier to the south and east.

The feature is named after the Bulgarian town of Sliven.

== Location ==
The peak is located at 62°36′03.5″S 60°07′42″W, which is 1.27 km east of Melnik Peak, 5.3 km southeast of Leslie Hill, 5.77 km south of Perperek Knoll, 2.95 km southwest of Sindel Point and 1.68 km north of Atanasoff Nunatak (Bulgarian mapping in 2005 and 2009).

== Maps ==
- South Shetland Islands. Scale 1:200000 topographic map. DOS 610 Sheet W 62 60. Tolworth, UK, 1968.
- Islas Livingston y Decepción. Mapa topográfico a escala 1:100000. Madrid: Servicio Geográfico del Ejército, 1991.
- S. Soccol, D. Gildea and J. Bath. Livingston Island, Antarctica. Scale 1:100000 satellite map. The Omega Foundation, USA, 2004.
- L.L. Ivanov et al., Antarctica: Livingston Island and Greenwich Island, South Shetland Islands (from English Strait to Morton Strait, with illustrations and ice-cover distribution), 1:100000 scale topographic map, Antarctic Place-names Commission of Bulgaria, Sofia, 2005
- L.L. Ivanov. Antarctica: Livingston Island and Greenwich, Robert, Snow and Smith Islands. Scale 1:120000 topographic map. Troyan: Manfred Wörner Foundation, 2010. ISBN 978-954-92032-9-5 (First edition 2009. ISBN 978-954-92032-6-4)
- Antarctic Digital Database (ADD). Scale 1:250000 topographic map of Antarctica. Scientific Committee on Antarctic Research (SCAR). Since 1993, regularly updated.
- L.L. Ivanov. Antarctica: Livingston Island and Smith Island. Scale 1:100000 topographic map. Manfred Wörner Foundation, 2017. ISBN 978-619-90008-3-0
- A. Kamburov and L. Ivanov. Bowles Ridge and Central Tangra Mountains: Livingston Island, Antarctica. Scale 1:25000 map. Sofia: Manfred Wörner Foundation, 2023. ISBN 978-619-90008-6-1
