= Godech =

Godech Годеч
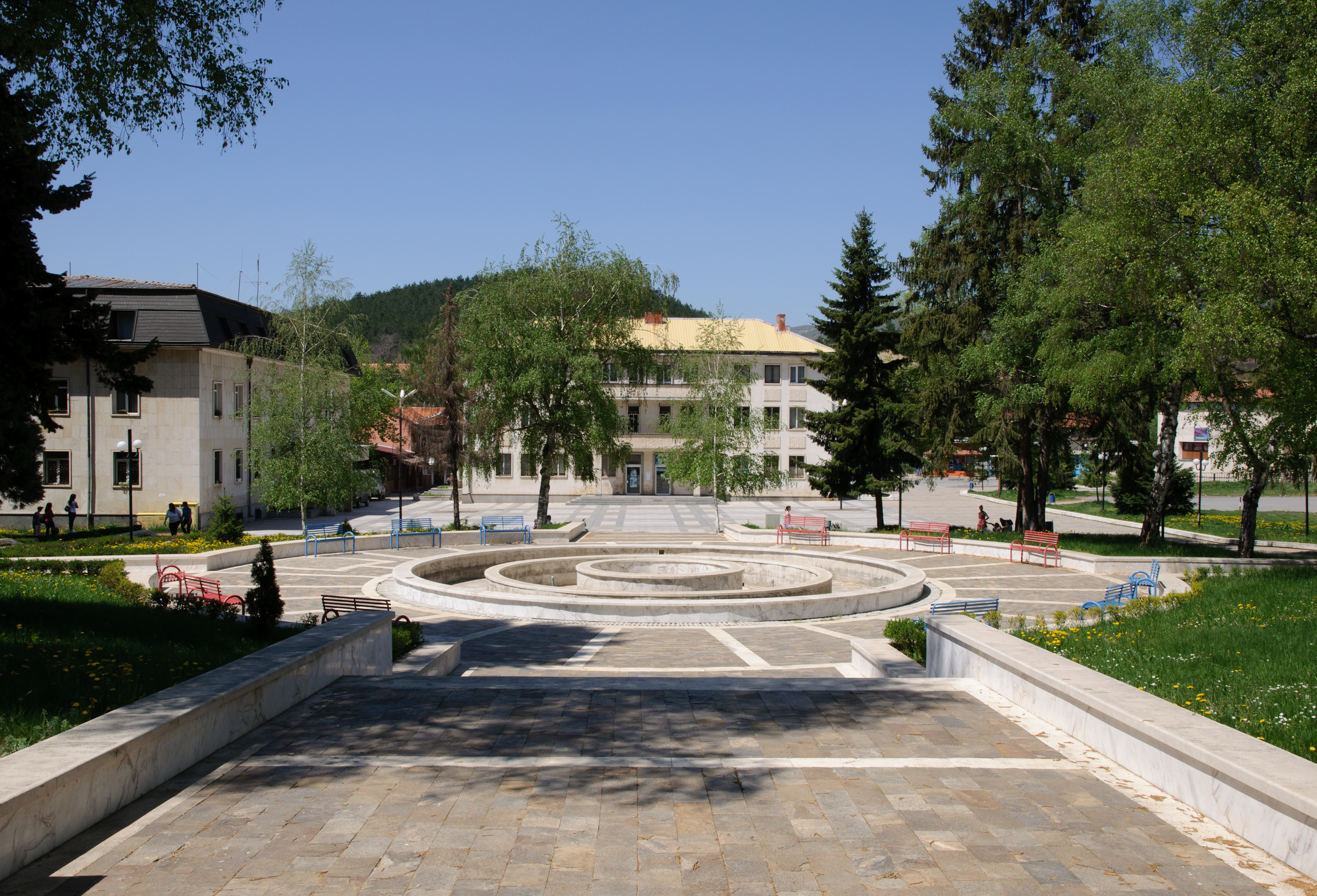
- Godech central square

- Location of Godech
- Coordinates: 43°00′0″N 23°03′30″E
- Country: Bulgaria
- Province (Oblast): Sofia Province

Government
  - Mayor: Andrey Andreev
- Elevation: 692 m (2,270 ft)

Population (2006)
  - Total: 4,663
- Time zone: UTC+2 (EET)
  - Summer (DST): UTC+3 (EEST)
- Postal Code: 2240
- Area code: 0729
- Vehicle registration: СО

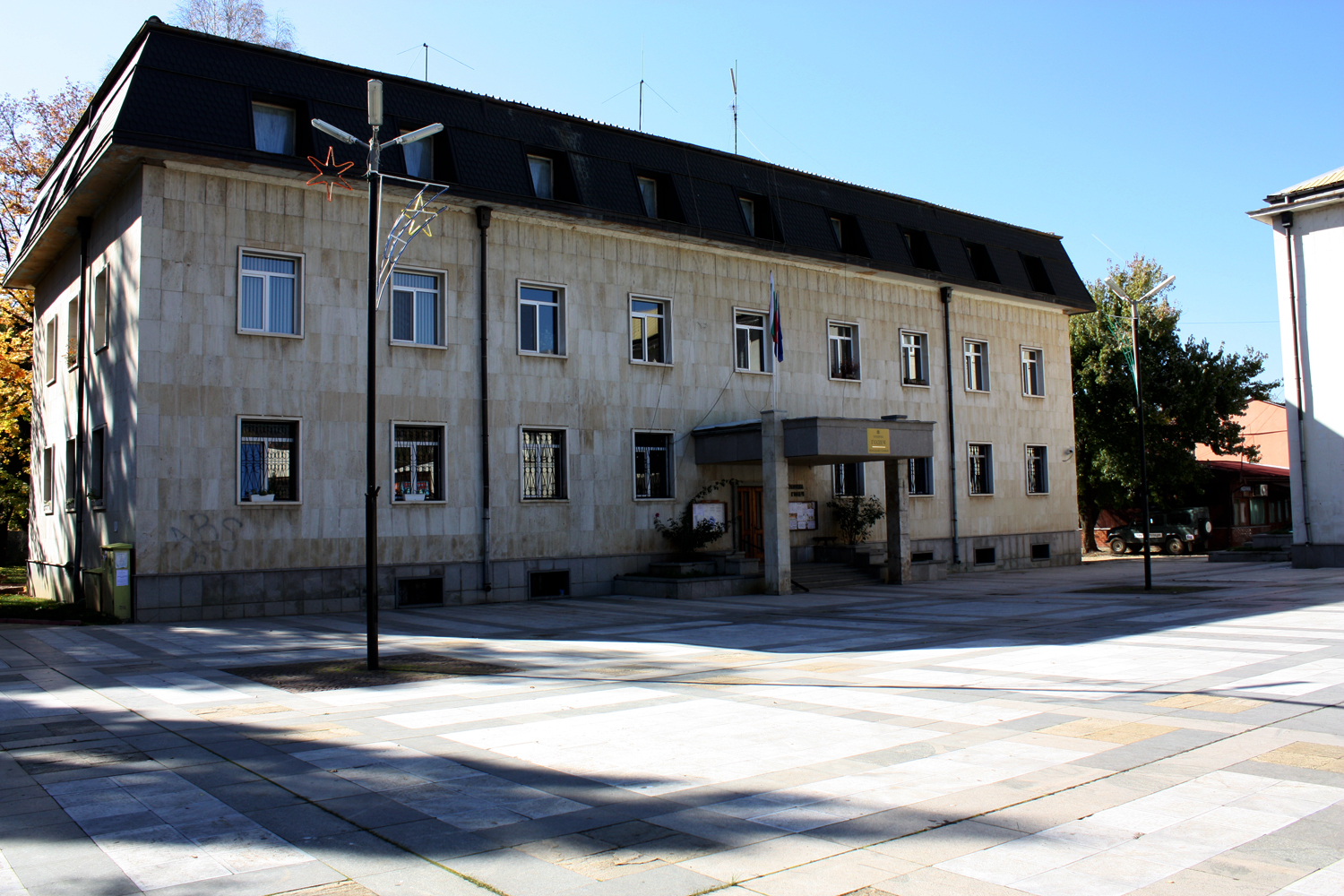
Townhall of Godech

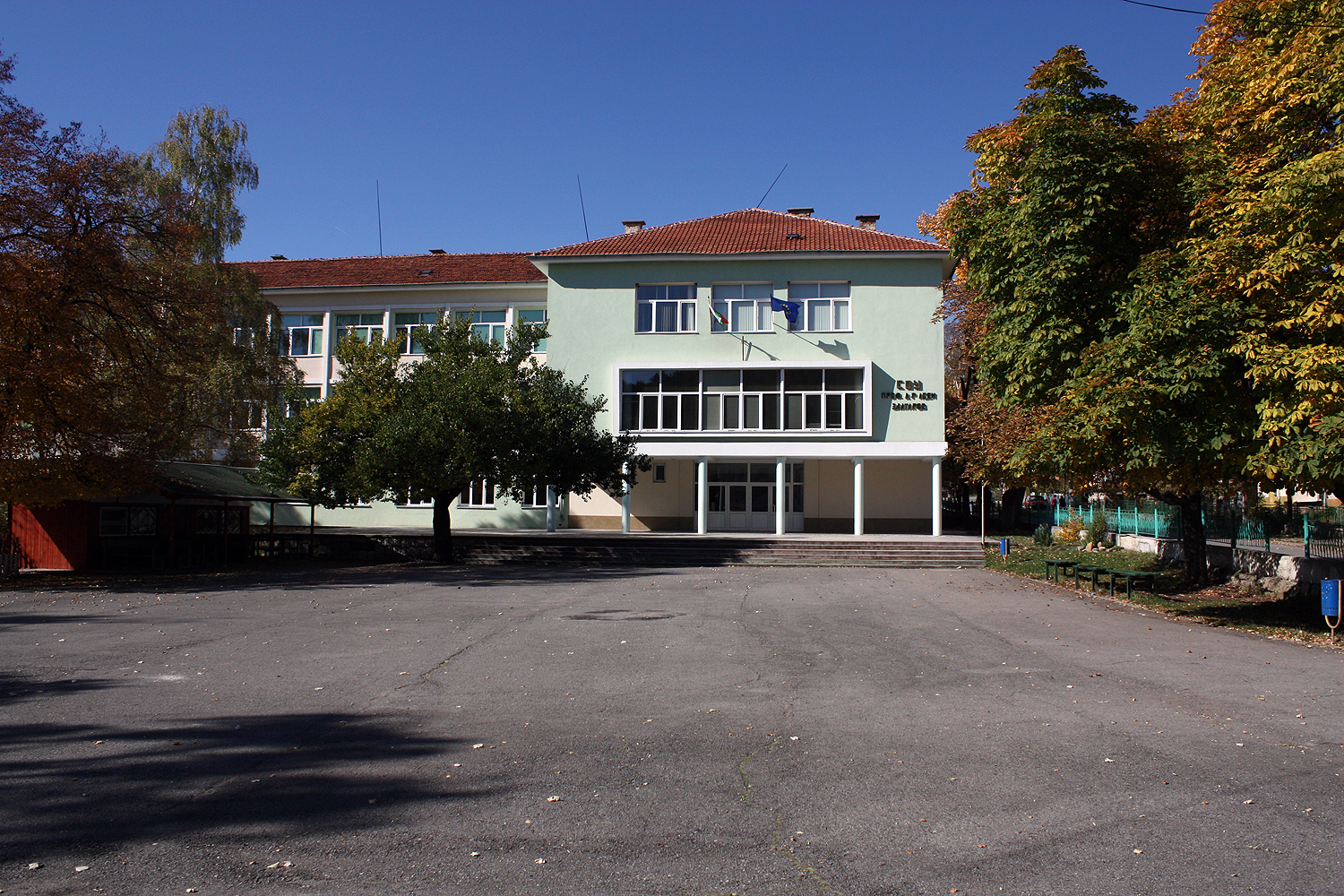
Godech Secondary School

Godech (Bulgarian: Годеч [ɡoˈdɛt͡ʃ]) is a town located in the Sofia Province, of Bulgaria. The town is founded in a valley on the far west of Stara Planina, where the Nishava River passes. The settlement is about 20 km east of the Serbian border and has its highest peak Kom (2016 m) to the north. Godech is officially a town with 4,663 inhabitants (as of 2006). It is the administrative center of the Godech municipality.

== History ==
A number of archaeological finds prove that the Godech region has been inhabited since the prehistorical times and since the times of the Thracians and Romans. The evidences dating from the Middle Ages and the Bulgarian National Revival are rather meagre. In 1453 Godech was mentioned for first time in the Ottoman records. There is a still preserved inscription in St. Nikola church in the village of Tuden and according to it the church was built in 1400 '"when the Ottomans took possession of Bulgaria'". About eleven years later another church with three apses and loopholes was built in the village of Gubesh, located nearby.

The town's name is derived from the personal name Godek, a developed form of Godo or Gode or a shortened form of Godimir. It might also mean a "suitable, convenient place".

== Honour ==
Godech Nunatak on Livingston Island in the South Shetland Islands, Antarctica is named after Godech.

== Economy ==
The town is home to the only factory for light-emitting diodes within the European Union. In operation since February 2011, the facility of total 10 500m2, worth $12 million and 51%-owned by Bulgarian battery maker Monbat AD, employs about 140 people.

Another major employer is AQ Magnit AD, a subsidiary of Swedish company AQ Group, with a 7,000-m^{2} plant manufacturing transformers, inductive components, and cabling for clients such as Bombardier Inc. and Ericsson.

== Twin cities ==
Godech is twinned with the following cities:

- (Serbia) Dimitrovgrad
- (Russia) Podolsk
