= Melnik Ridge =

Feature in the South Shetland Islands, Antarctica

Location of Livingston Island in the South Shetland Islands.

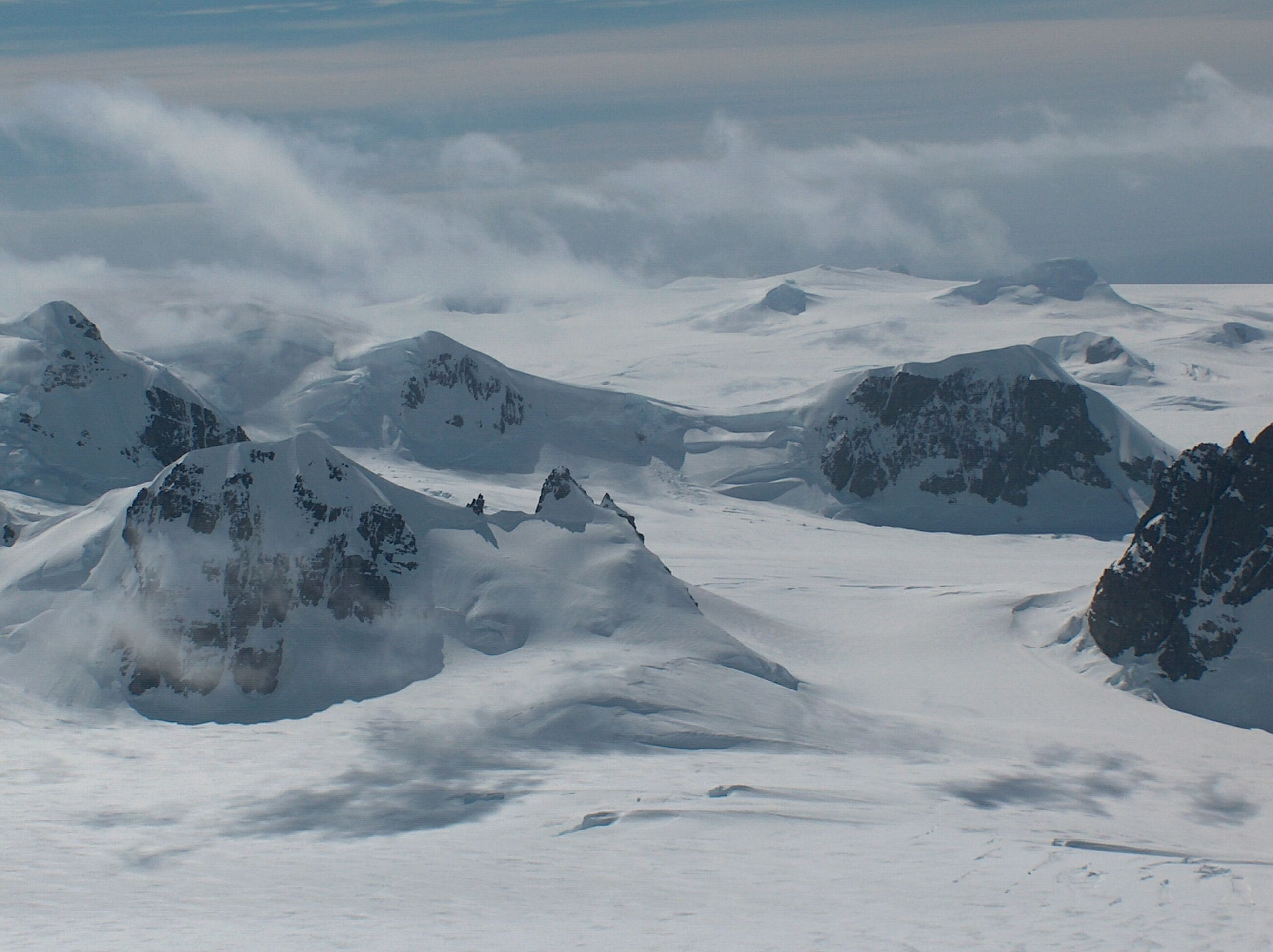
Melnik Ridge from Komini Peak, with Pirdop Gate in the foreground.

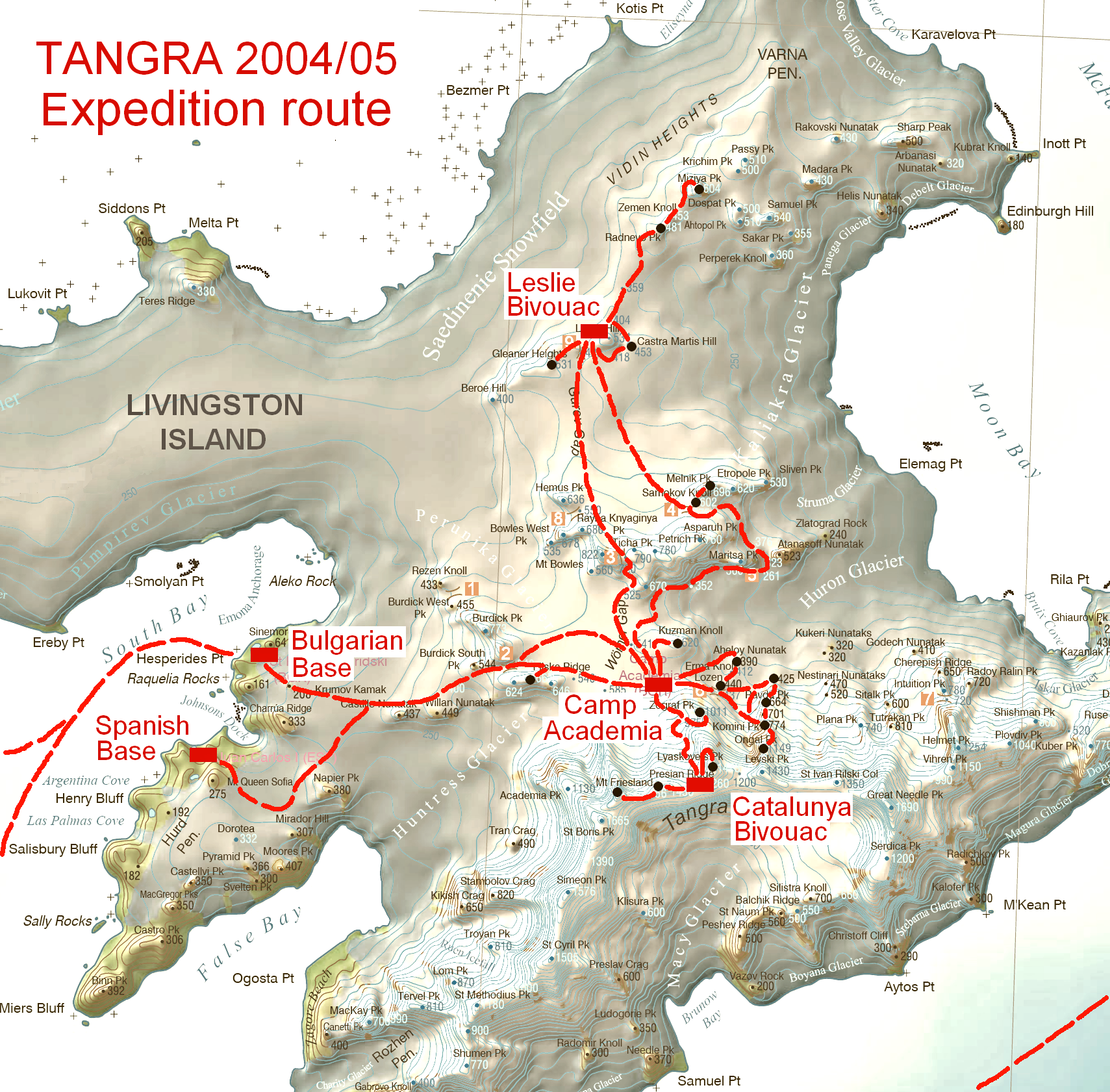
The survey route of Tangra 2004/05 including Melnik Ridge.

Topographic map of Livingston Island and Smith Island.

Melnik Ridge (Melnishki Hrebet \'mel-nish-ki 'hre-bet\) is a narrow ridge rising to 696 m in eastern Livingston Island in the South Shetland Islands, Antarctica bounded by Kaliakra Glacier to the north and west, and Struma Glacier to the south, and linked to Bowles Ridge by the 575 m high Yankov Gap. The ridge is 2.2 km long in the east–west direction, featuring Sliven Peak and Etropole Peak, with the summit Melnik Peak forming its west extremity. It has partly snow-free southern slopes. The ridge was first surveyed by Lyubomir Ivanov and Doychin Vasilev from Camp Academia on 28 December 2004, as part of Tangra 2004/05 topographic survey.

Melnik is the name of a town in south-western Bulgaria.

== Location ==
The ridge midpoint is located at 62°36′05″S 60°08′30″W (UK Directorate of Overseas Surveys mapping in 1968, Bulgarian mapping in 2005 and 2009 from topographic surveys in 1995/96 and 2004/05).

== Maps ==
- South Shetland Islands. Scale 1:200000 topographic map. DOS 610 Sheet W 62 60. Tolworth, UK, 1968.
- Islas Livingston y Decepción. Mapa topográfico a escala 1:100000. Madrid: Servicio Geográfico del Ejército, 1991.
- S. Soccol, D. Gildea and J. Bath. Livingston Island, Antarctica. Scale 1:100000 satellite map. The Omega Foundation, USA, 2004.
- L.L. Ivanov et al., Antarctica: Livingston Island and Greenwich Island, South Shetland Islands (from English Strait to Morton Strait, with illustrations and ice-cover distribution), 1:100000 scale topographic map, Antarctic Place-names Commission of Bulgaria, Sofia, 2005
- L.L. Ivanov. Antarctica: Livingston Island and Greenwich, Robert, Snow and Smith Islands. Scale 1:120000 topographic map. Troyan: Manfred Wörner Foundation, 2010. ISBN 978-954-92032-9-5 (First edition 2009. ISBN 978-954-92032-6-4)
- Antarctic Digital Database (ADD). Scale 1:250000 topographic map of Antarctica. Scientific Committee on Antarctic Research (SCAR), 1993–2016.
- A. Kamburov and L. Ivanov. Bowles Ridge and Central Tangra Mountains: Livingston Island, Antarctica. Scale 1:25000 map. Sofia: Manfred Wörner Foundation, 2023. ISBN 978-619-90008-6-1
