= Transitional Bulgarian dialects =

Group of dialects of Bulgarian

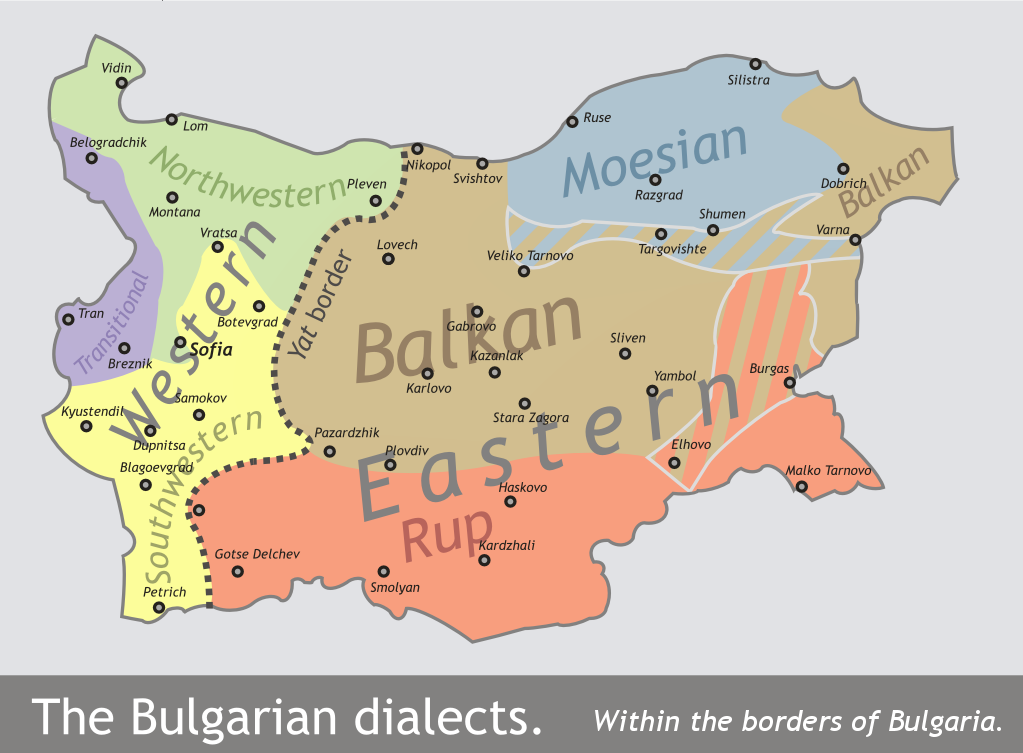
Map of the Bulgarian dialects within Bulgaria

The Transitional Bulgarian dialects are a group of Bulgarian dialects, whose speakers are located west of the yat boundary and are part of the Western Bulgarian dialects. As they have most of the typical characteristics of the North-Western Bulgarian dialects, they are sometimes classified as belonging to this subgroup under the name of Extreme North-Western dialects. On Bulgarian territory, the Transitional dialects occupy a narrow strip of land along the Bulgarian border with Serbia, including the regions of Tran, Breznik, Godech, Chiprovtsi and Belogradchik. They also cross the border to include the dialects or subdialects of the Bulgarian minority in the Western Outlands (the regions of Tsaribrod and Bosilegrad). The Transitional dialects are part of the Torlak dialectal group also spoken in southeastern Serbia and North Macedonia and are part of the gradual transition from Bulgarian to Serbian. The Bulgarian Transitional dialects and the Serbian Prizren-Timok dialects are loosely characterised by mixed, predominantly Serbian phonology and predominantly Bulgarian morphology. The features described here are characteristic only of the Transitional dialects within Bulgaria.

== Phonological characteristics ==
- Old Bulgarian ѣ (yat) is always pronounced as ɛ vs. standard Bulgarian я/е (ʲa/ɛ) – бел/бели
- ч/дж (t͡ʃ/d͡ʒ) for Proto-Slavic *tʲ/*dʲ - леча, меджу ("lentils", "between"). Partial manifestation of reflex ʒd for Proto-Slavic *dʲ (as in standard Bulgarian) in words like чужд ("foreign"). The future tense particle is че
- у for Old Bulgarian ѫ (yus) (as in standard Serbo-Croatian): мука vs. Standard Bulgarian мъка ("sorrow")
- ə for Old Bulgarian ь and ъ in all positions: сън ("sleep")
- Complete loss of consonant х (x) in all positions (preserved in both Bulgarian and Serbian): мъ vs. Standard Bulgarian мъх ("moss")
- Preservation of final l (as in Bulgarian): бил ("was")
- Articulation of voiced consonants at the end of the word (as in Serbian) in some areas/subdialects (Tran, Breznik) and devoicing (as in Bulgarian) in others (Bosilegrad, Tsaribrod, Godech, Belogradchik)
- Lack of phonemic pitch (as in standard Bulgarian)
- Lack of phonemic length (as in standard Bulgarian)
- Frequent stress on the final syllable in polysyllabic words (as in standard Bulgarian, not possible in standard Serbo-Croatian, though frequent in archaic Serbo-Croatian dialects): жен'а ("woman")
- Complete loss of consonant f. It does not exist even in new words where it is usually replaced by v: венер vs. Standard Bulgarian фенер ("lantern")

== Grammatical and morphological characteristics ==
- Definiteness realized with post-positive articles. The definite articles are usually -ът, -та, -то, -те as in standard Bulgarian
- Breakup of the Old Bulgarian case system (as in standard Bulgarian). Apart from nominal forms, there is an agglomerative form only for masculine animate names and feminine names
- Loss of the infinitive (as in standard Bulgarian)
- Full retention of the aorist and the imperfect (as in standard Bulgarian)
- Doubling of objects with an additional object pronoun (as in standard Bulgarian)
- Ending -e for plural of feminine nouns and adjectives (as in standard Serbo-Croatian): жене ("women")
- The plural endings of adjectives vary from three (for each gender, as in standard Serbo-Croatian), to two (one for masculine and neuter and one for feminine) and one (as in standard Bulgarian), depending on dialect/subdialect
- Ending -мо for 1st person pl. present time (as in standard Serbo-Croatian): носимо ("we carry")
- Ending -ше for 3rd person pl. past tense (vs. -ха in Bulgarian): плетоше equal to Serbian imperfect tense, vs. standard Bulgarian плетоха ("they knitted")

For the phonological and morphological characteristics of the individual dialects included in the dialectal group, cf. individual articles.

== Sources ==
- Sprachatlas Ostserbiens und Westbulgariens, Andrej N. Sobolev. Vol. I-III. Biblion Verlag, Marburg, 1998.
- Стойков, Стойко: Българска диалектология, Акад. изд. "Проф. Марин Дринов", 2006
- Sussex, Roland and Cubberley, Paul: The Slavic Languages, Cambridge, 2006
