= Godech Nunatak =

Rocky peak in the South Shetland Islands, Antarctica

Location of Tangra Mountains on Livingston Island in the South Shetland Islands.

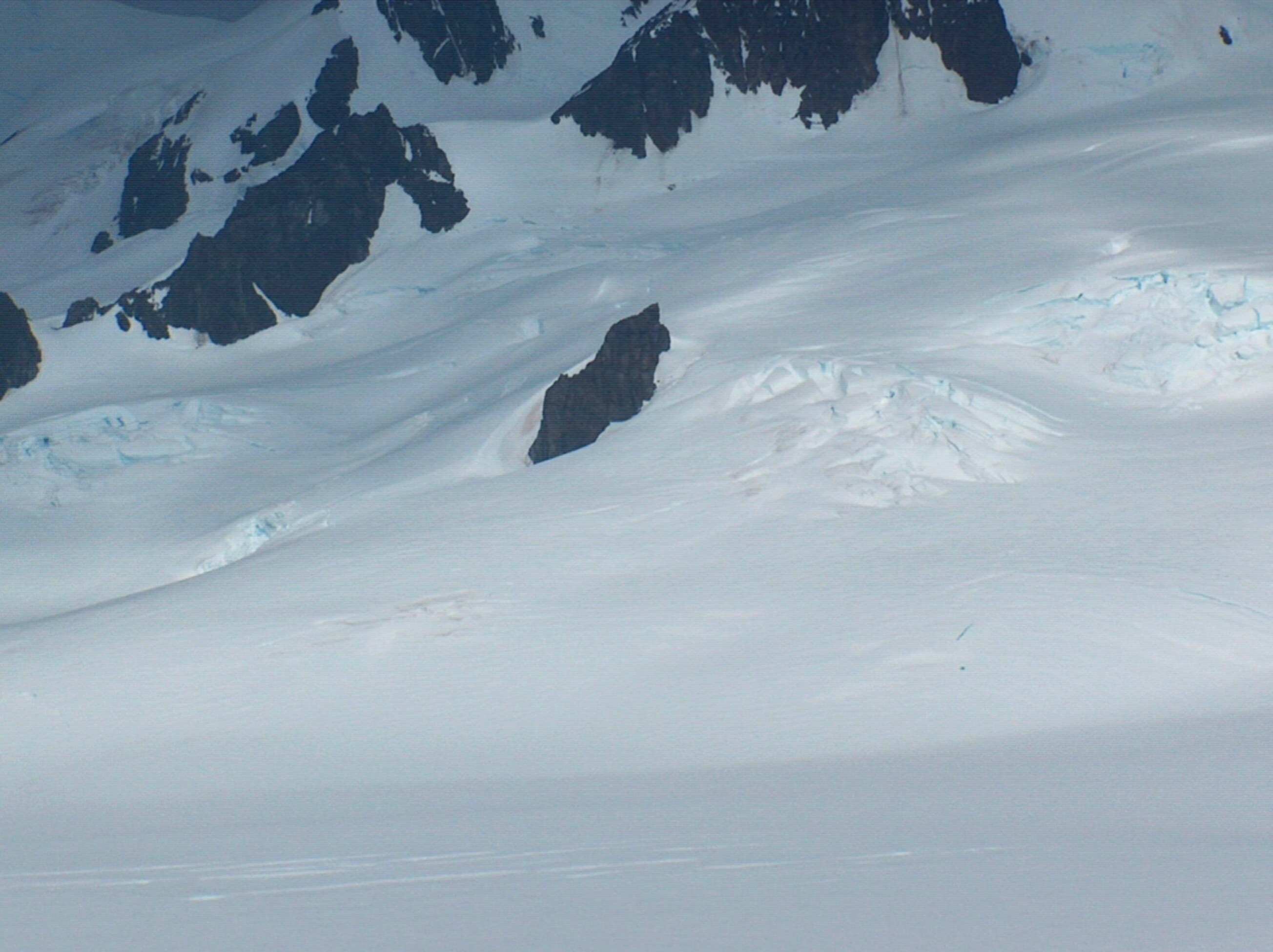
Godech Nunatak

Topographic map of Livingston Island, Greenwich, Robert, Snow and Smith Islands.

Godech Nunatak (Godechki Nunatak \go-'dech-ki 'nu-na-tak\) is a rocky 410m peak in lower Huron Glacier, in the north foothills of Tangra Mountains on Livingston Island, South Shetland Islands in Antarctica. The peak is named after the town of Godech in Western Bulgaria.

== Location ==
The peak is located at 62°38′10″S 60°02′59.5″W, which is 570 m west of Cherepish Ridge, 1.97 km east of Kukeri Nunataks, 3.1 km southeast of Zlatograd Rock and 2.5 km west-southwest of Yana Point (Bulgarian mapping in 2005 and 2009 from the Tangra 2004/05 topographic survey).

== Maps ==
- L.L. Ivanov et al. Antarctica: Livingston Island and Greenwich Island, South Shetland Islands. Scale 1:100000 topographic map. Sofia: Antarctic Place-names Commission of Bulgaria, 2005.
- L.L. Ivanov. Antarctica: Livingston Island and Greenwich, Robert, Snow and Smith Islands. Scale 1:120000 topographic map. Troyan: Manfred Wörner Foundation, 2009. ISBN 978-954-92032-6-4
- A. Kamburov and L. Ivanov. Bowles Ridge and Central Tangra Mountains: Livingston Island, Antarctica. Scale 1:25000 map. Sofia: Manfred Wörner Foundation, 2023. ISBN 978-619-90008-6-1
