= Sindel Point =

Low ice-free point in Antarctica

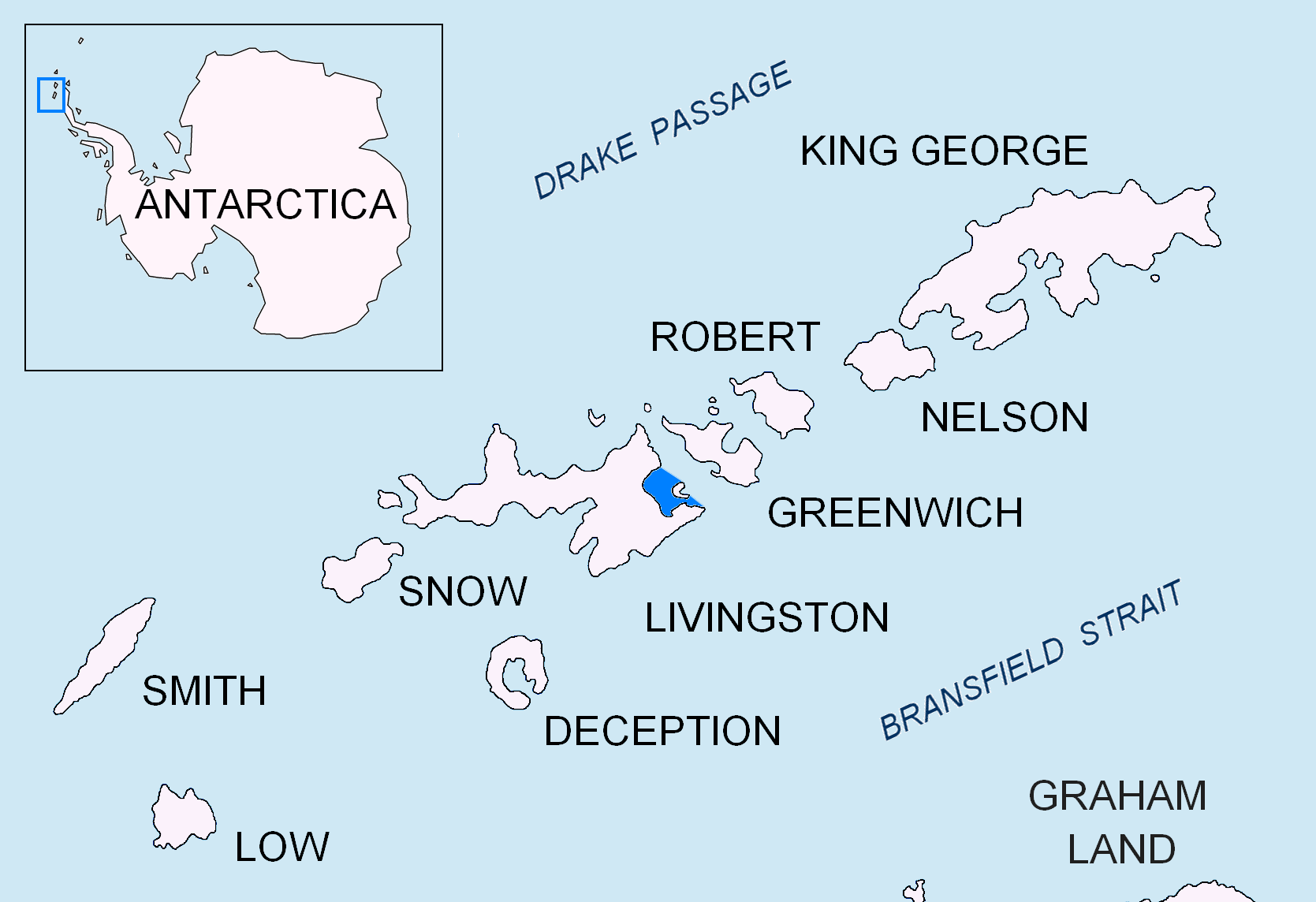
Location of Moon Bay, Livingston Island in the South Shetland Islands.

Topographic map of Livingston Island, Greenwich, Robert, Snow and Smith Islands.

Sindel Point (Bulgarian: нос Синдел, ‘Nos Sindel’ \'nos 'sin-del\) is a low ice-free point on the east coast of Livingston Island in the South Shetland Islands, Antarctica projecting 250 m into Moon Bay to separate the glacier termini of Kaliakra Glacier to the north and Struma Glacier to the south. Situated 2.9 km northeast of Sliven Peak and 5.75 km southwest of Edinburgh Hill.

The point is named after the settlement of Sindel in northeastern Bulgaria.

== Location ==
Sindel Point is located at 62°35′01″S 60°05′06″W. Bulgarian topographic survey Tangra 2004/05 and mapping in 2009.

== Maps ==
- L.L. Ivanov. Antarctica: Livingston Island and Greenwich, Robert, Snow and Smith Islands. Scale 1:120000 topographic map. Troyan: Manfred Wörner Foundation, 2009. ISBN 978-954-92032-6-4
- A. Kamburov and L. Ivanov. Bowles Ridge and Central Tangra Mountains: Livingston Island, Antarctica. Scale 1:25000 map. Sofia: Manfred Wörner Foundation, 2023. ISBN 978-619-90008-6-1
