= Nestinari Nunataks =

Pair of rocky peaks in the South Shetland Islands, Antarctica

Location of Tangra Mountains on Livingston Island in the South Shetland Islands.

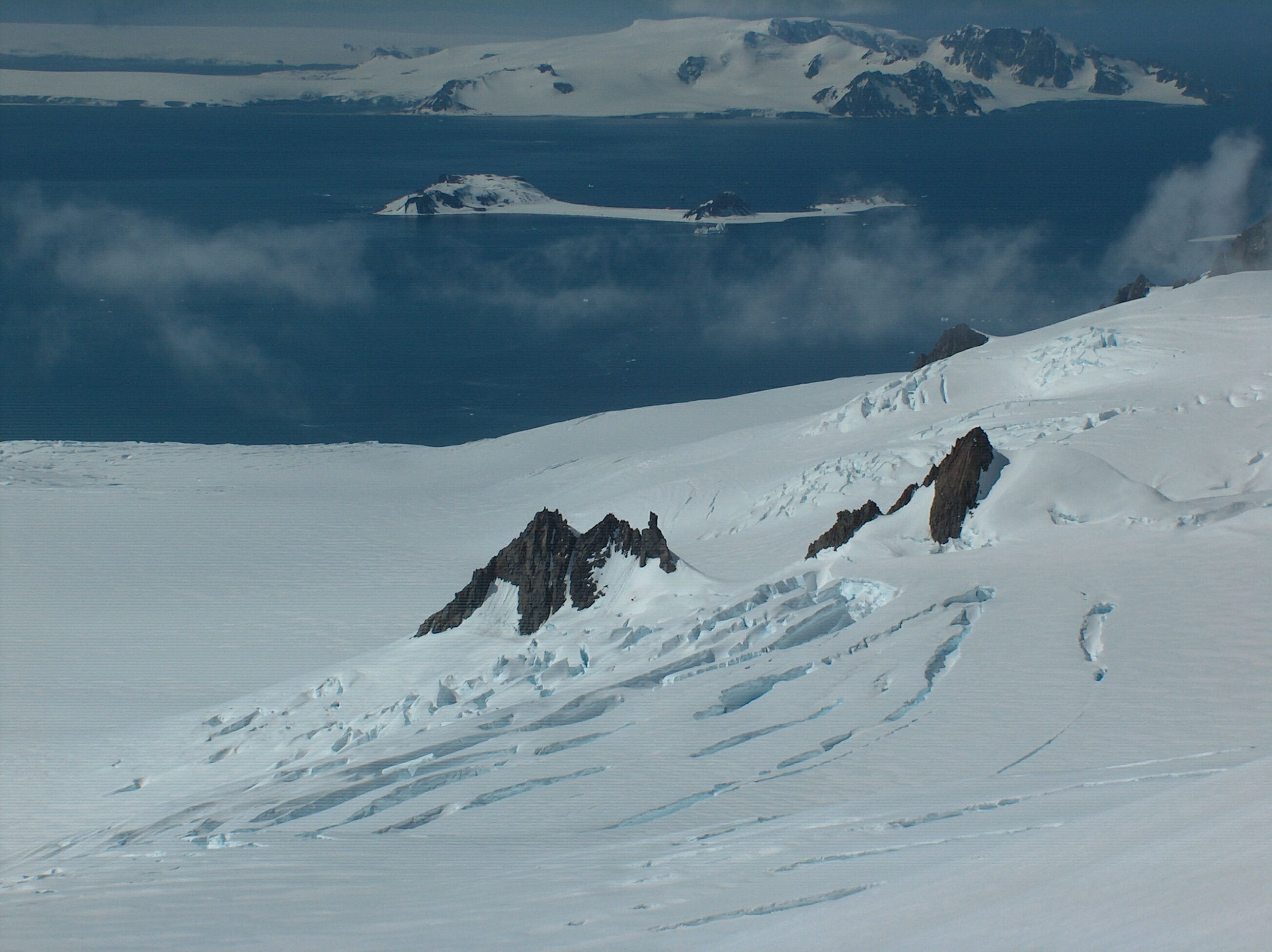
Nestinari Nunataks from Komini Peak.

Topographic map of Livingston Island

Nestinari Nunataks (Nestinarski Nunatatsi \ne-sti-'nar-ski 'nu-na-ta-tsi\) are a pair of rocky peaks of elevation 470 m and 520 m in middle Huron Glacier, Livingston Island in the South Shetland Islands, Antarctica. Situated in the north foothills of Tangra Mountains, 210 m away from each other.

They are named after the Greco-Bulgarian folkloric ritual of ‘Nestinari’ involving barefoot dancing on live embers.

== Location ==
The higher nunatak is located at 62°38′43.5″S 60°05′19.5″W, which is 2.55 km east of Lozen Nunatak, 3.88 km east-southeast of Kuzman Knoll, 1.1 km northwest of Plana Peak, 2.6 km north-northeast of Levski Peak and 1.49 km east-northeast of Ravda Peak (Bulgarian topographic survey Tangra 2004/05, and mapping in 2005 and 2009).

== Maps ==
- L.L. Ivanov et al. Antarctica: Livingston Island and Greenwich Island, South Shetland Islands. Scale 1:100000 topographic map. Sofia: Antarctic Place-names Commission of Bulgaria, 2005.
- L.L. Ivanov. Antarctica: Livingston Island and Greenwich, Robert, Snow and Smith Islands. Scale 1:120000 topographic map. Troyan: Manfred Wörner Foundation, 2009. ISBN 978-954-92032-6-4
- Antarctic Digital Database (ADD). Scale 1:250000 topographic map of Antarctica. Scientific Committee on Antarctic Research (SCAR). Since 1993, regularly upgraded and updated.
- L.L. Ivanov. Antarctica: Livingston Island and Smith Island. Scale 1:100000 topographic map. Manfred Wörner Foundation, 2017. ISBN 978-619-90008-3-0
- A. Kamburov and L. Ivanov. Bowles Ridge and Central Tangra Mountains: Livingston Island, Antarctica. Scale 1:25000 map. Sofia: Manfred Wörner Foundation, 2023. ISBN 978-619-90008-6-1
