= Melnik Peak =

Mountain in Livingston Island, South Shetland Islands, Antarctica

Location of Livingston Island in the South Shetland Islands.

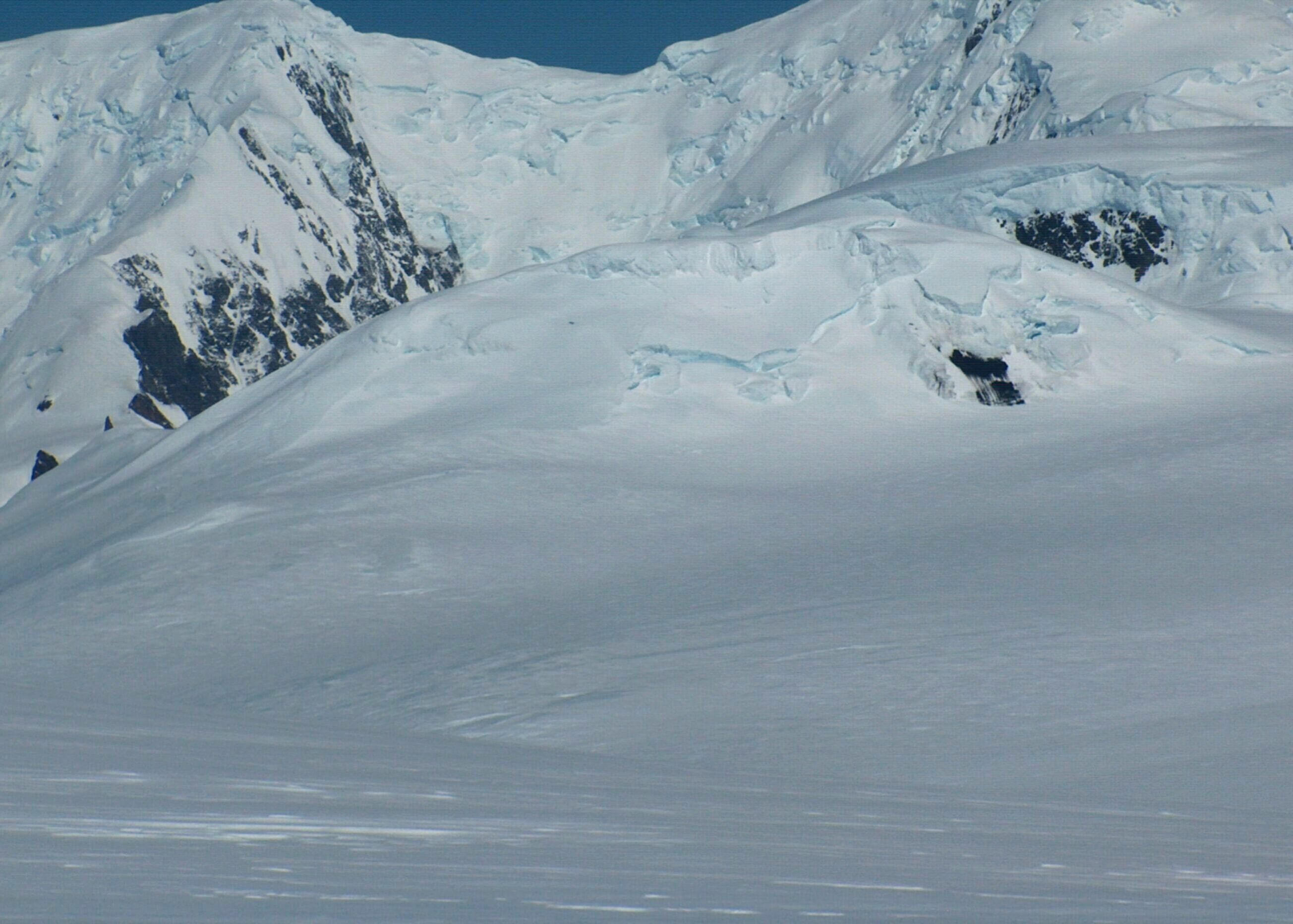
Melnik Peak from Miziya Peak.

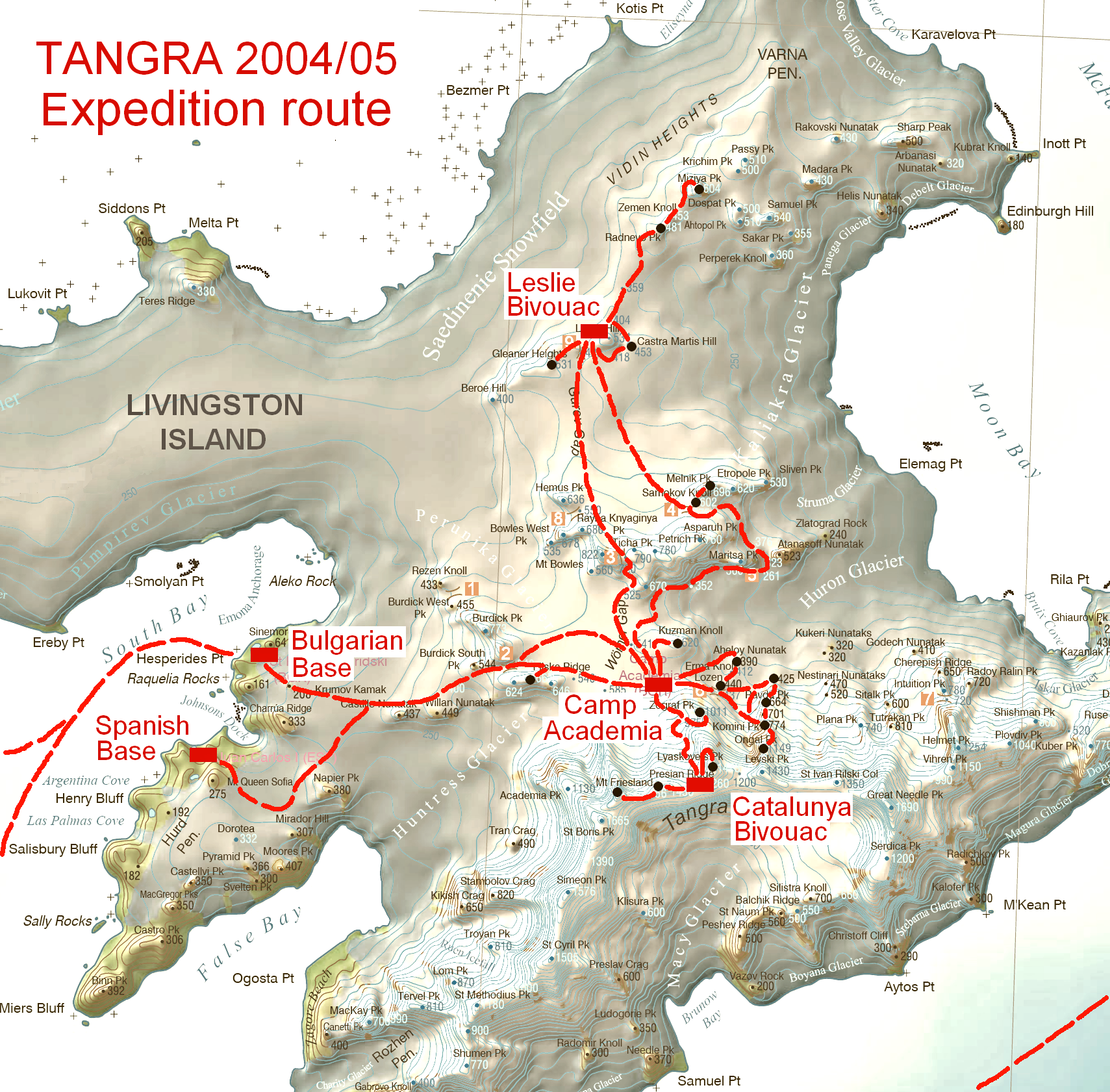
The survey route of Tangra 2004/05 including Melnik Peak.

Topographic map of Livingston Island and Smith Island.

Melnik Peak (Bulgarian: връх Мельник, romanized: vrah Melnik, IPA: [ˈvrɤx ˈmɛɫnik]) is the 696 m summit of Melnik Ridge in eastern Livingston Island, South Shetland Islands in Antarctica. Surmounting Kaliakra Glacier to the north and west, and Struma Glacier to the southeast. The peak takes its name from Melnik Ridge.

First ascent by Lyubomir Ivanov and Doychin Vasilev from Camp Academia on 28 December 2004, as part of Tangra 2004/05 survey.

== Location ==
The peak is located at 62°36′06.4″S 60°09′11.2″W, which is 4.04 km southwest of Sindel Point, 2.41 km northwest of Atanasoff Nunatak, 1.26 km north of Asparuh Peak, 3.03 km northeast by east of Mount Bowles, 3.5 km east by north of Hemus Peak, 4.05 km southeast by south of Castra Martis Hill, and 7.4 km south of Miziya Peak (Bulgarian topographic survey Tangra 2004/05, and mapping in 2005 and 2009).

== Maps ==
- L.L. Ivanov et al. Antarctica: Livingston Island and Greenwich Island, South Shetland Islands. Scale 1:100000 topographic map. Sofia: Antarctic Place-names Commission of Bulgaria, 2005.
- L.L. Ivanov. Antarctica: Livingston Island and Greenwich, Robert, Snow and Smith Islands. Scale 1:120000 topographic map. Troyan: Manfred Wörner Foundation, 2009.
- A. Kamburov and L. Ivanov. Bowles Ridge and Central Tangra Mountains: Livingston Island, Antarctica. Scale 1:25000 map. Sofia: Manfred Wörner Foundation, 2023. ISBN 978-619-90008-6-1
