= Struma Glacier =

Glacier in Antarctica

- Location of Livingston Island in the South Shetland Islands

- Location within South Shetland Islands Location within Antarctica
- Location: Livingston Island; South Shetland Islands
- Coordinates: 62°36′25″S 60°07′00″W
- Length: 2.6 nautical miles (4.8 km; 3.0 mi)
- Width: 1 nautical mile (1.9 km; 1.2 mi)
- Thickness: unknown
- Terminus: Moon Bay
- Status: unknown

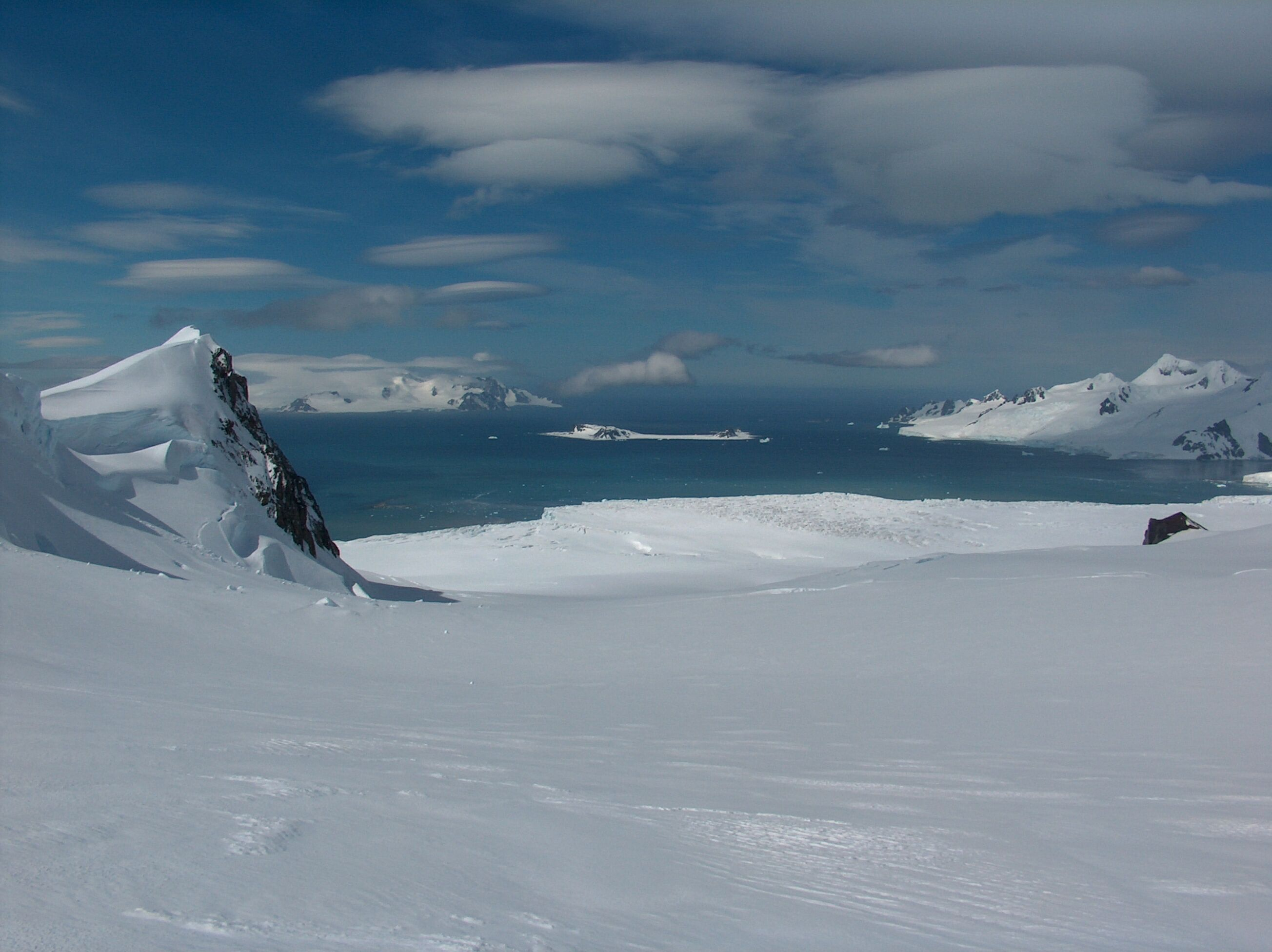
Struma Glacier with Sliven Peak on the left and Zlatograd Rock on the right, Moon Bay with Half Moon Island, and Greenwich Island (left) and Burgas Peninsula (right) in the background.

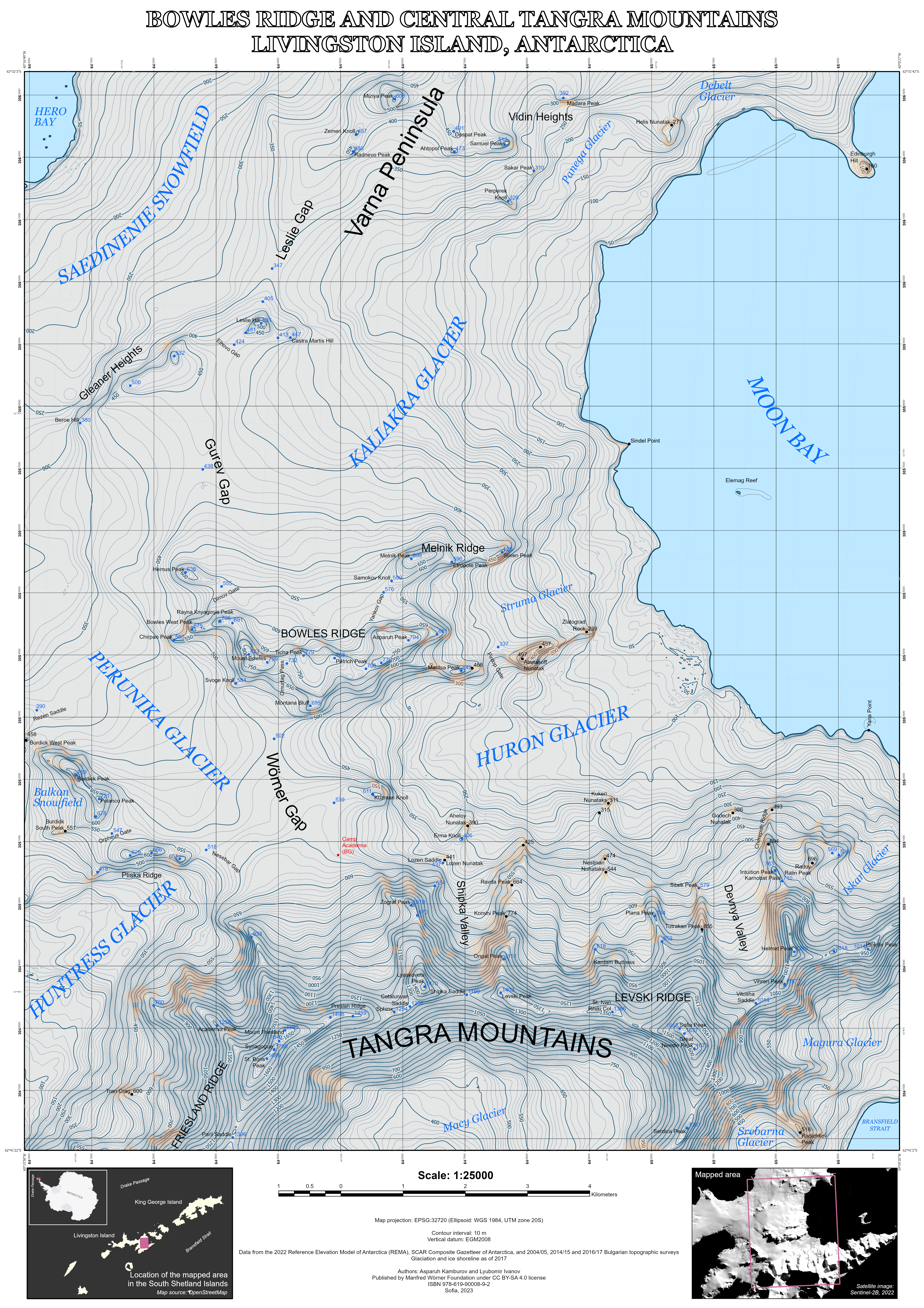
Topographic map of Bowles Ridge and central Tangra Mountains featuring Struma Glacier

Struma Glacier (Bulgarian: ледник Струма, romanized: lednik Struma, IPA: [ˈlɛdnik ˈstrumɐ]) is a glacier in eastern Livingston Island in the South Shetland Islands, Antarctica situated south of lower Kaliakra Glacier and north of Huron Glacier. Bounded by Melnik Ridge to the north, Yankov Gap to the west and Bowles Ridge to the south, it is 4.8 km long and 1.5 km wide, and flows eastwards into Moon Bay south of Sindel Point.

First crossed by the Bulgarians Lyubomir Ivanov and Doychin Vasilev from Camp Academia on 28 December 2004, as part of Tangra 2004/05 survey.

The glacier is named after the Struma River in Bulgaria and forms part of the overland route between Pirdop Gate and Yankov Gap.

== Location ==
The midpoint is located at 62°36′25″S 60°07′00″W. Bulgarian topographic survey Tangra 2004/05 and mapping in 2005 and 2009.

== See also ==
- List of glaciers in the Antarctic
- Glaciology

== Maps ==
- L.L. Ivanov et al. Antarctica: Livingston Island and Greenwich Island, South Shetland Islands. Scale 1:100000 topographic map. Sofia: Antarctic Place-names Commission of Bulgaria, 2005.
- L.L. Ivanov. Antarctica: Livingston Island and Greenwich, Robert, Snow and Smith Islands. Scale 1:120000 topographic map. Troyan: Manfred Wörner Foundation, 2010. ISBN 978-954-92032-9-5 (First edition 2009. ISBN 978-954-92032-6-4)
- Antarctic Digital Database (ADD). Scale 1:250000 topographic map of Antarctica. Scientific Committee on Antarctic Research (SCAR). Since 1993, regularly upgraded and updated.
- L.L. Ivanov. Antarctica: Livingston Island and Smith Island. Scale 1:100000 topographic map. Manfred Wörner Foundation, 2017. ISBN 978-619-90008-3-0
- A. Kamburov and L. Ivanov. Bowles Ridge and Central Tangra Mountains: Livingston Island, Antarctica. Scale 1:25000 map. Sofia: Manfred Wörner Foundation, 2023. ISBN 978-619-90008-6-1
