= Atanasoff Nunatak =

523m peak in Livingston Island, Antarctica

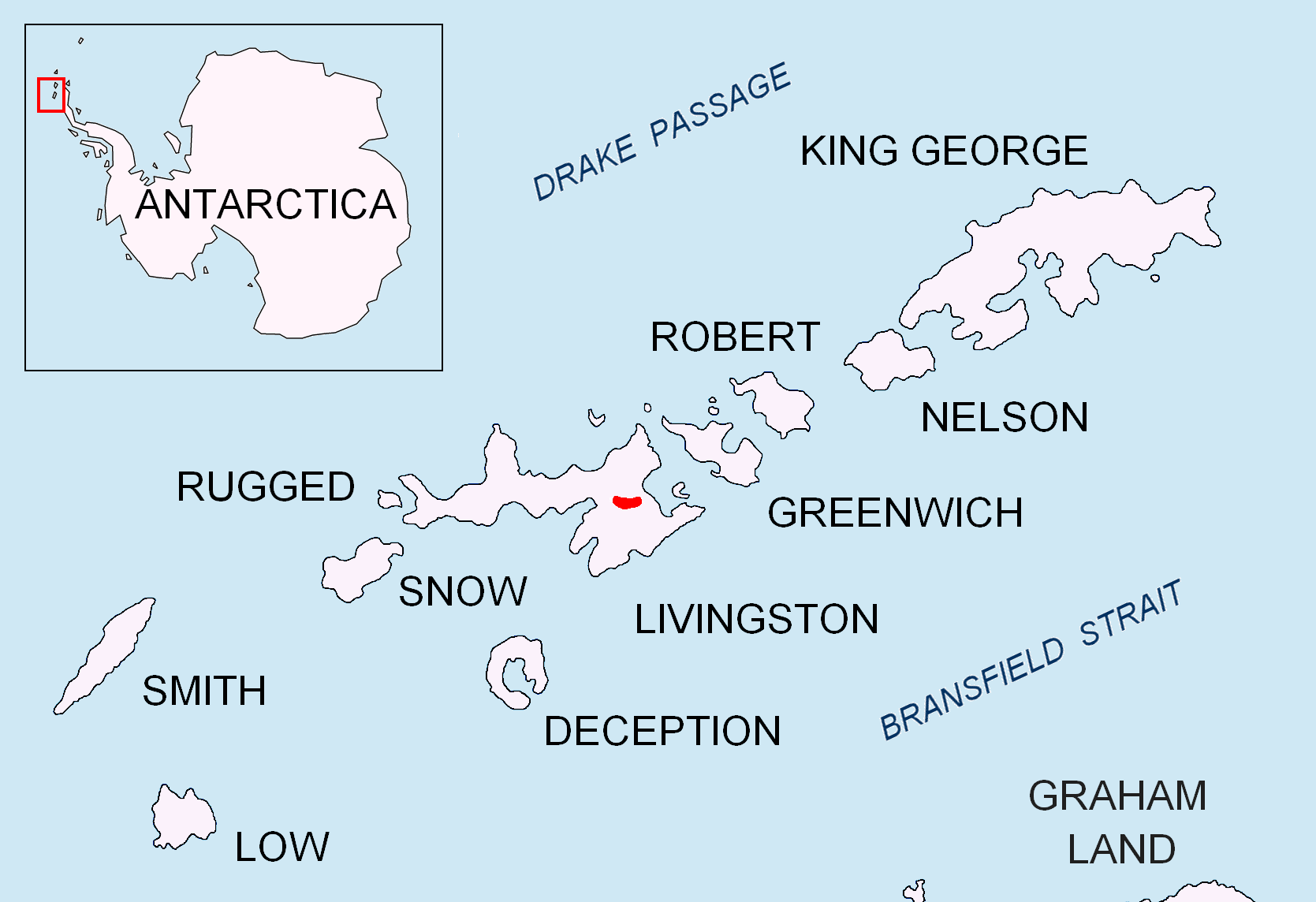
Location of Bowles Ridge on Livingston Island in the South Shetland Islands

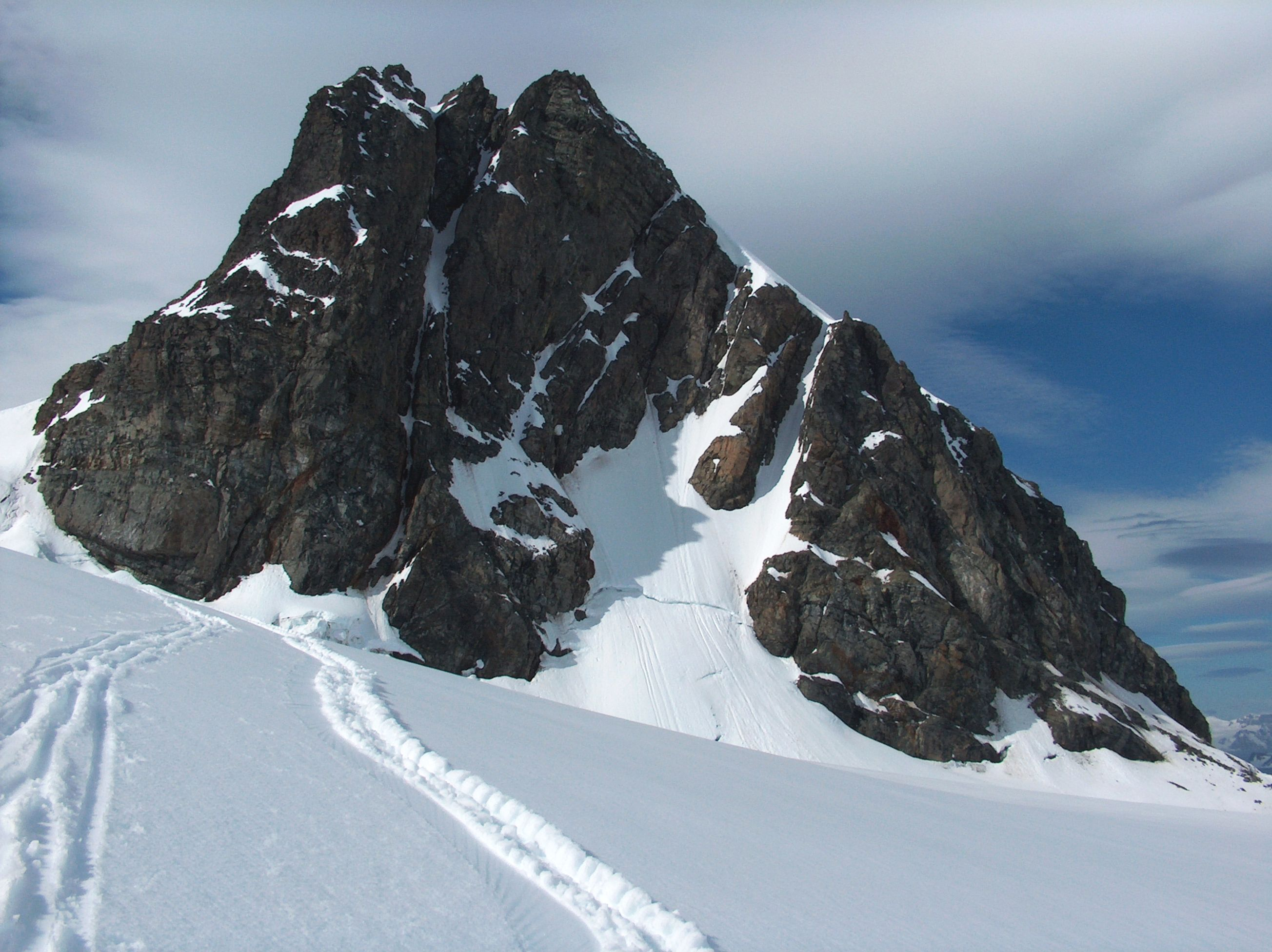
Atanasoff Nunatak from Pirdop Gate

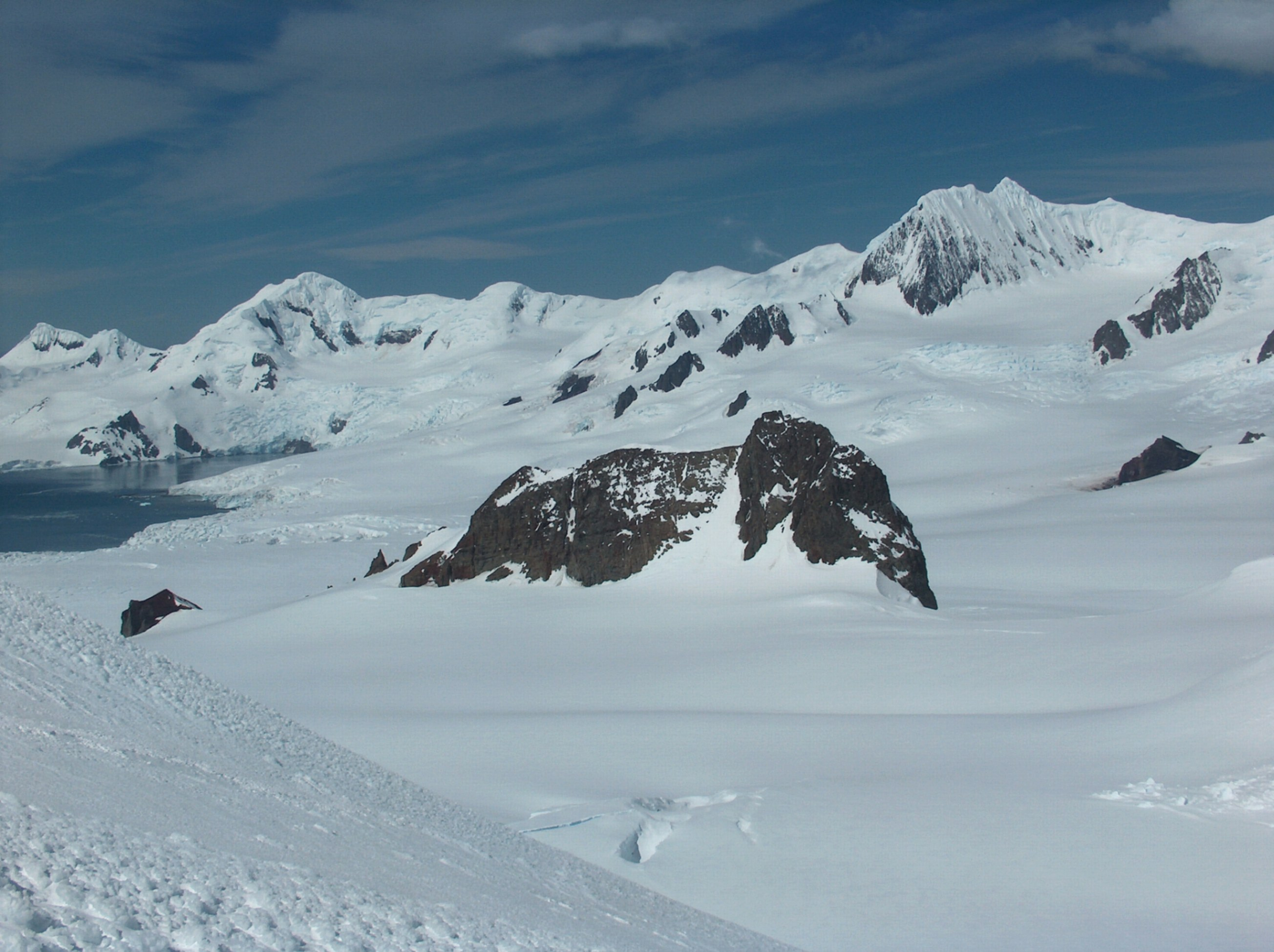
Atanasoff Nunatak from Melnik Peak, with Struma Glacier in the foreground, and Huron Glacier and eastern Tangra Mountains in the background

Topographic map of Livingston Island and Smith Island

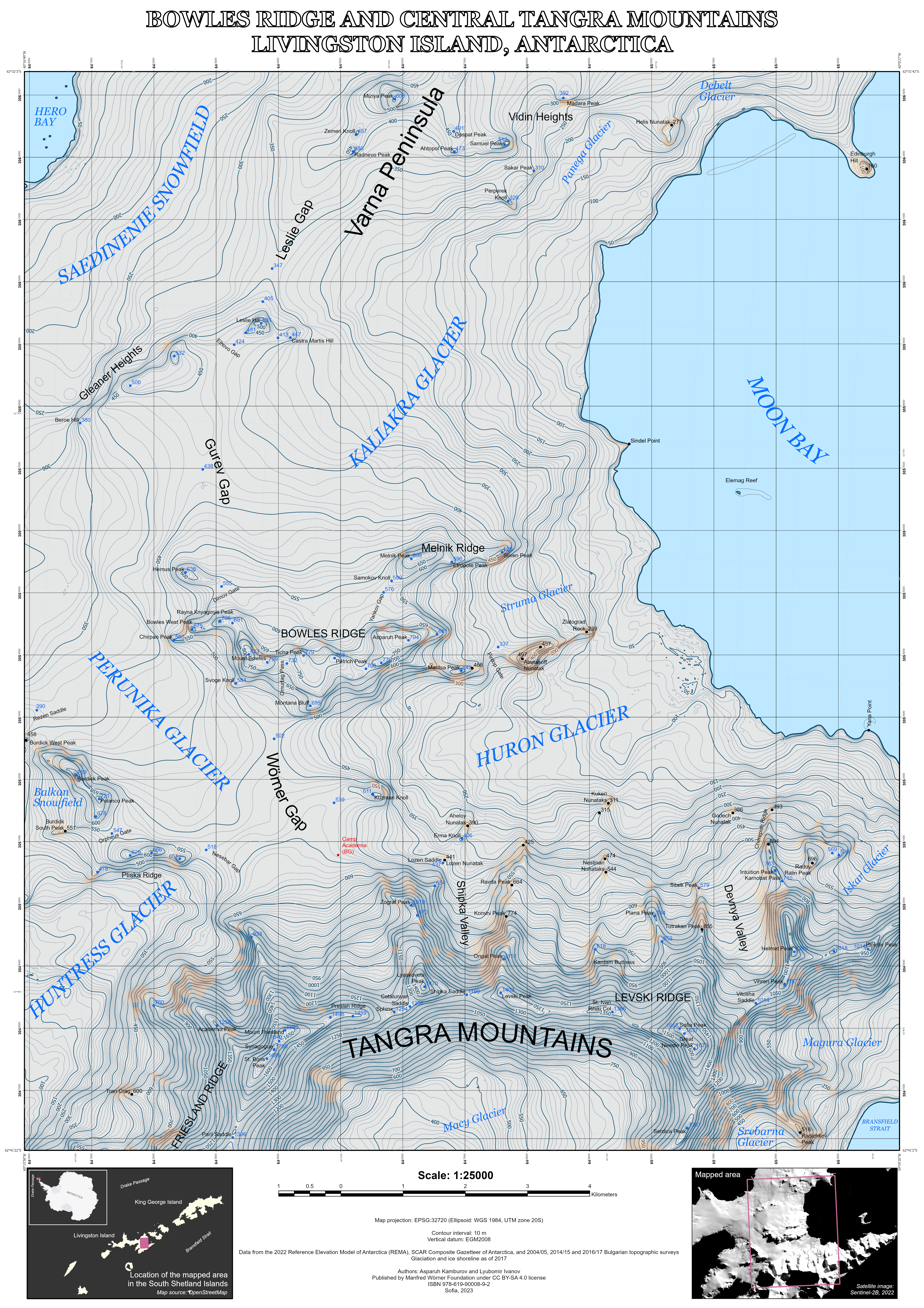
Topographic map of Bowles Ridge and central Tangra Mountains featuring Atanasoff Nunatak

Atanasoff Nunatak (Atanasov Nunatak \a-ta-'na-sov 'nu-na-tak\) is a nunatak, a sharp peak rising to 523 m (1,716 ft) in the east extremity of Bowles Ridge, Livingston Island, Antarctica. The peak surmounts Huron Glacier to the south and east, and Struma Glacier to the north. The peak is “named in honour of the Bulgarian American John Atanasoff (1903–1995) who constructed the first electronic digital computer”.

== Location ==
The peak is located at 62°36′54″S 60°06′57″W which is next east of Pirdop Gate, 3.32 km (2.06 mi) northeast of Kuzman Knoll, 1.18 km (0.73 mi) east-northeast of Maritsa Peak, 4.44 km (2.76 mi) east of Mount Bowles, 2.41 km (1.50 mi) southeast of Melnik Peak, 1.68 km (1.04 mi) south of Sliven Peak, 6.86 km (4.26 mi) north-northwest of Great Needle Peak (Falsa Aguja Peak) and 5.37 km (3.34 mi) north of Levski Peak (Antarctica). British mapping in 1968, and Bulgarian mapping in 2005 and 2009 from the Tangra 2004/05 survey.

== See also ==
- Tangra 2004/05
- Bowles Ridge
- Livingston Island

== Maps ==
- South Shetland Islands. Scale 1:200000 topographic map. DOS 610 Sheet W 62 60. Tolworth, UK, 1968.
- Islas Livingston y Decepción. Mapa topográfico a escala 1:100000. Madrid: Servicio Geográfico del Ejército, 1991.
- S. Soccol, D. Gildea and J. Bath. Livingston Island, Antarctica. Scale 1:100000 satellite map. The Omega Foundation, USA, 2004.
- L.L. Ivanov et al., Antarctica: Livingston Island and Greenwich Island, South Shetland Islands (from English Strait to Morton Strait, with illustrations and ice-cover distribution), 1:100000 scale topographic map, Antarctic Place-names Commission of Bulgaria, Sofia, 2005
- L.L. Ivanov. Antarctica: Livingston Island and Greenwich, Robert, Snow and Smith Islands. Scale 1:120000 topographic map. Troyan: Manfred Wörner Foundation, 2010. ISBN 978-954-92032-9-5 (First edition 2009. ISBN 978-954-92032-6-4)
- Antarctic Digital Database (ADD). Scale 1:250000 topographic map of Antarctica. Scientific Committee on Antarctic Research (SCAR). Since 1993, regularly upgraded and updated.
- L.L. Ivanov. Antarctica: Livingston Island and Smith Island. Scale 1:100000 topographic map. Manfred Wörner Foundation, 2017. ISBN 978-619-90008-3-0
- A. Kamburov and L. Ivanov. Bowles Ridge and Central Tangra Mountains: Livingston Island, Antarctica. Scale 1:25000 map. Sofia: Manfred Wörner Foundation, 2023. ISBN 978-619-90008-6-1
