= Simeon Peak =

Mountain on Livingston Island, Antarctica

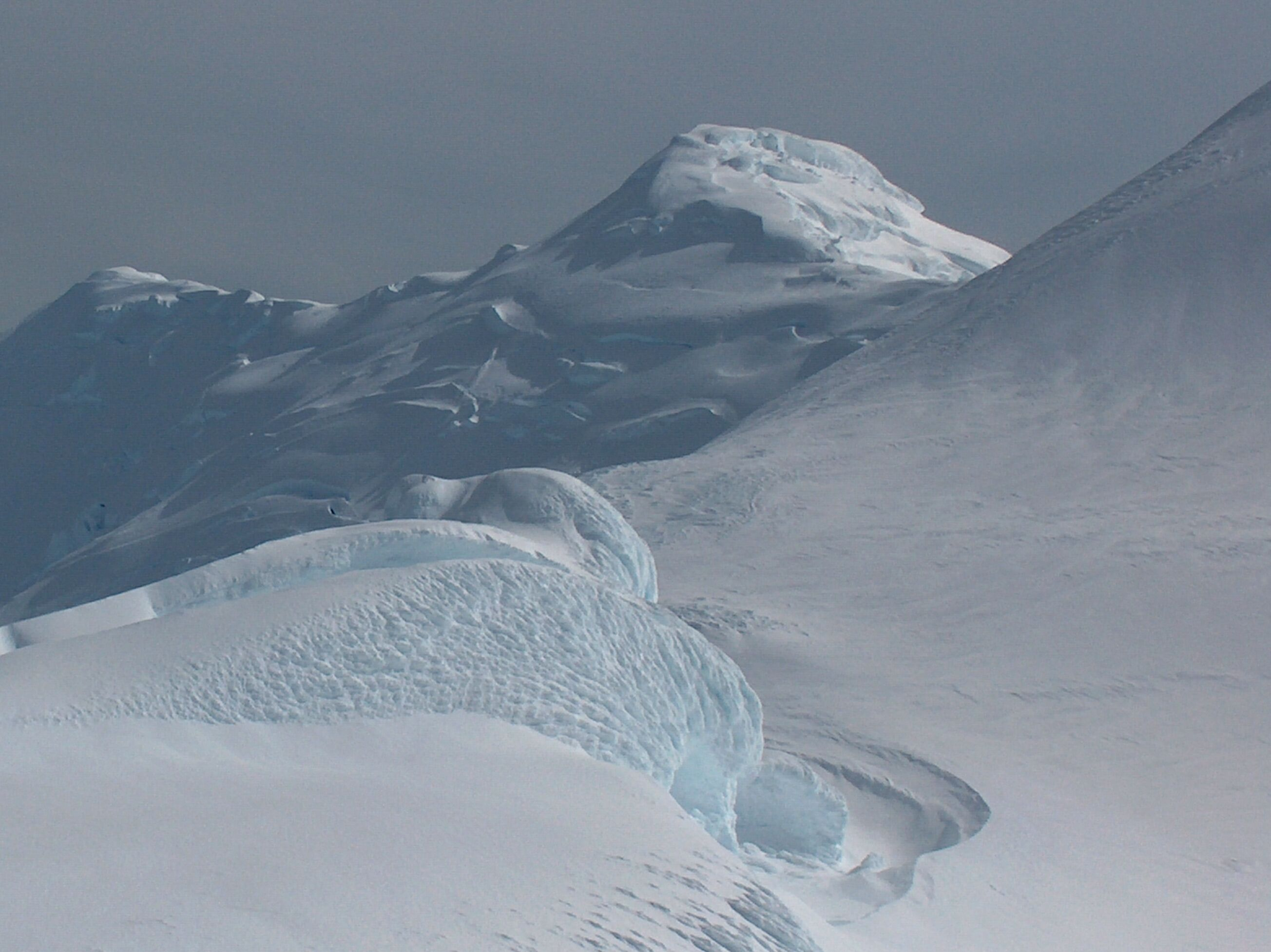
- Simeon Peak from the west slopes of Lyaskovets Peak, with Catalunyan Saddle in the foreground and St. Cyril Peak on the far left.

Highest point
- Elevation: 1,580 m (5,180 ft)

Geography
- Location of Tangra Mountains on Livingston Island in the South Shetland Islands
- Location: Livingston Island, South Shetland Islands, Antarctica
- Parent range: Tangra Mountains

Climbing
- First ascent: 16 January 2017 Doychin Boyanov, Nikolay Petkov and Nedelcho Hazarbasanov

Simeon Peak (Bulgarian: връх Симеон, romanized: vrah Simeon, IPA: [ˈvrɤx simɛˈɔn]) rises to 1,580 m in Friesland Ridge, Tangra Mountains, Livingston Island in the South Shetland Islands, Antarctica. The peak is heavily glaciated, connected to St. Boris Peak to the northeast by Paril Saddle, and surmounts Huntress Glacier to the northwest, Ruen Icefall to the southwest, and Macy Glacier to the east. It was first ascended and GPS-surveyed by the Bulgarian climbers D. Boyanov, N. Petkov and N. Hazarbasanov from Nesebar Gap via the head of Huntress Glacier, Academia Peak, St. Boris Peak and Paril Saddle on 15 January 2017.

The peak is named after Czar Simeon the Great of Bulgaria, 893-927 AD.

== Location ==
The peak is located at 62°41′27″S 60°12′25″W, which is 2.48 km south-southwest of Mount Friesland, 1.85 km south-southwest of St. Boris Peak and 1.69 km north of St. Cyril Peak. British mapping in 1968, Argentine in 1980, Spanish in 1991, and Bulgarian in 2005 and 2009 from topographic surveys in 1995/96 (estimated elevation 1576 m) and 2004/05.

== Maps ==
- Chart of South Shetland including Coronation Island, &c. from the exploration of the sloop Dove in the years 1821 and 1822 by George Powell Commander of the same. Scale ca. 1:200000. London: Laurie, 1822
- South Shetland Islands. Scale 1:200000 topographic map. DOS 610 Sheet W 62 60. Tolworth, UK, 1968.
- Islas Livingston y Decepción. Mapa topográfico a escala 1:100000. Madrid: Servicio Geográfico del Ejército, 1991.
- S. Soccol, D. Gildea and J. Bath. Livingston Island, Antarctica. Scale 1:100000 satellite map. The Omega Foundation, USA, 2004.
- L.L. Ivanov et al., Antarctica: Livingston Island and Greenwich Island, South Shetland Islands (from English Strait to Morton Strait, with illustrations and ice-cover distribution), 1:100000 scale topographic map, Antarctic Place-names Commission of Bulgaria, Sofia, 2005
- L.L. Ivanov. Antarctica: Livingston Island and Greenwich, Robert, Snow and Smith Islands. Scale 1:120000 topographic map. Troyan: Manfred Wörner Foundation, 2010. ISBN 978-954-92032-9-5 (First edition 2009. ISBN 978-954-92032-6-4)
- Antarctic Digital Database (ADD). Scale 1:250000 topographic map of Antarctica. Scientific Committee on Antarctic Research (SCAR). Since 1993, regularly upgraded and updated.
- L.L. Ivanov. Antarctica: Livingston Island and Smith Island. Scale 1:100000 topographic map. Manfred Wörner Foundation, 2017. ISBN 978-619-90008-3-0

== Gallery ==
Topographic map of Livingston Island and Smith Island

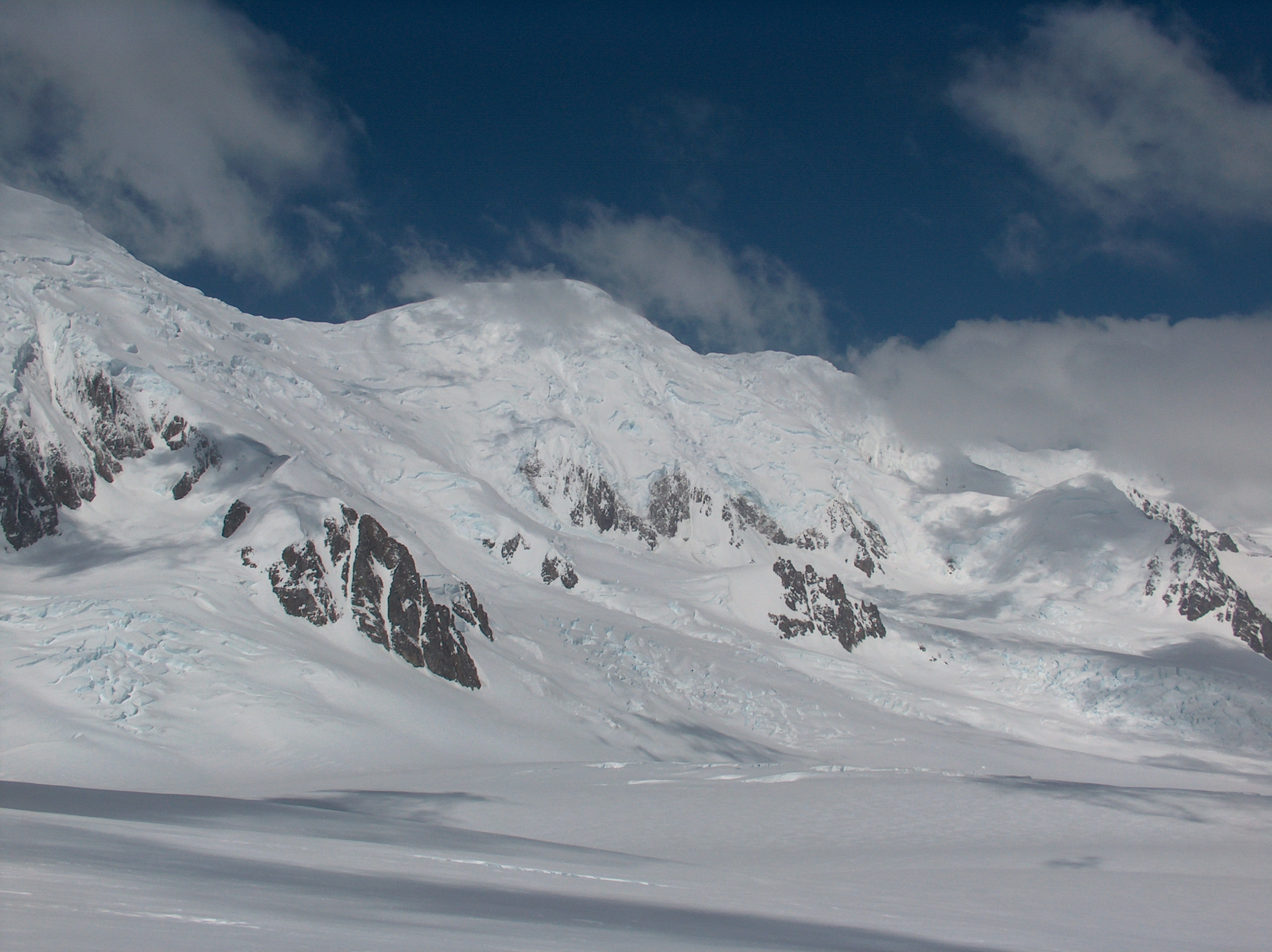
Simeon Peak from Willan Saddle, with St. Cyril Peak on the right and Huntress Glacier in the foreground

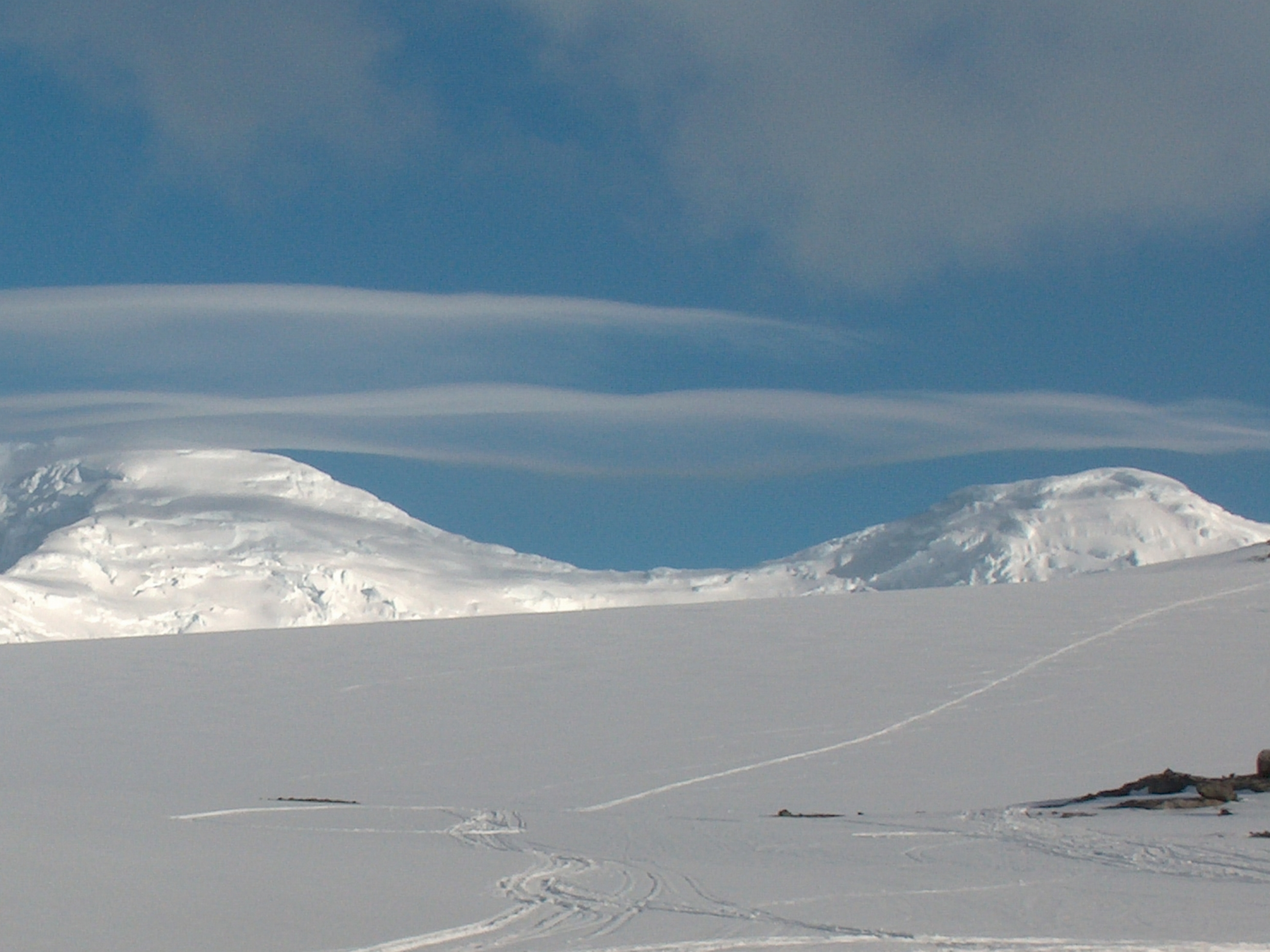
Paril Saddle from Bulgarian Base locality, with Simeon Peak on the right, St. Boris Peak on the left, and Balkan Snowfield in the foreground

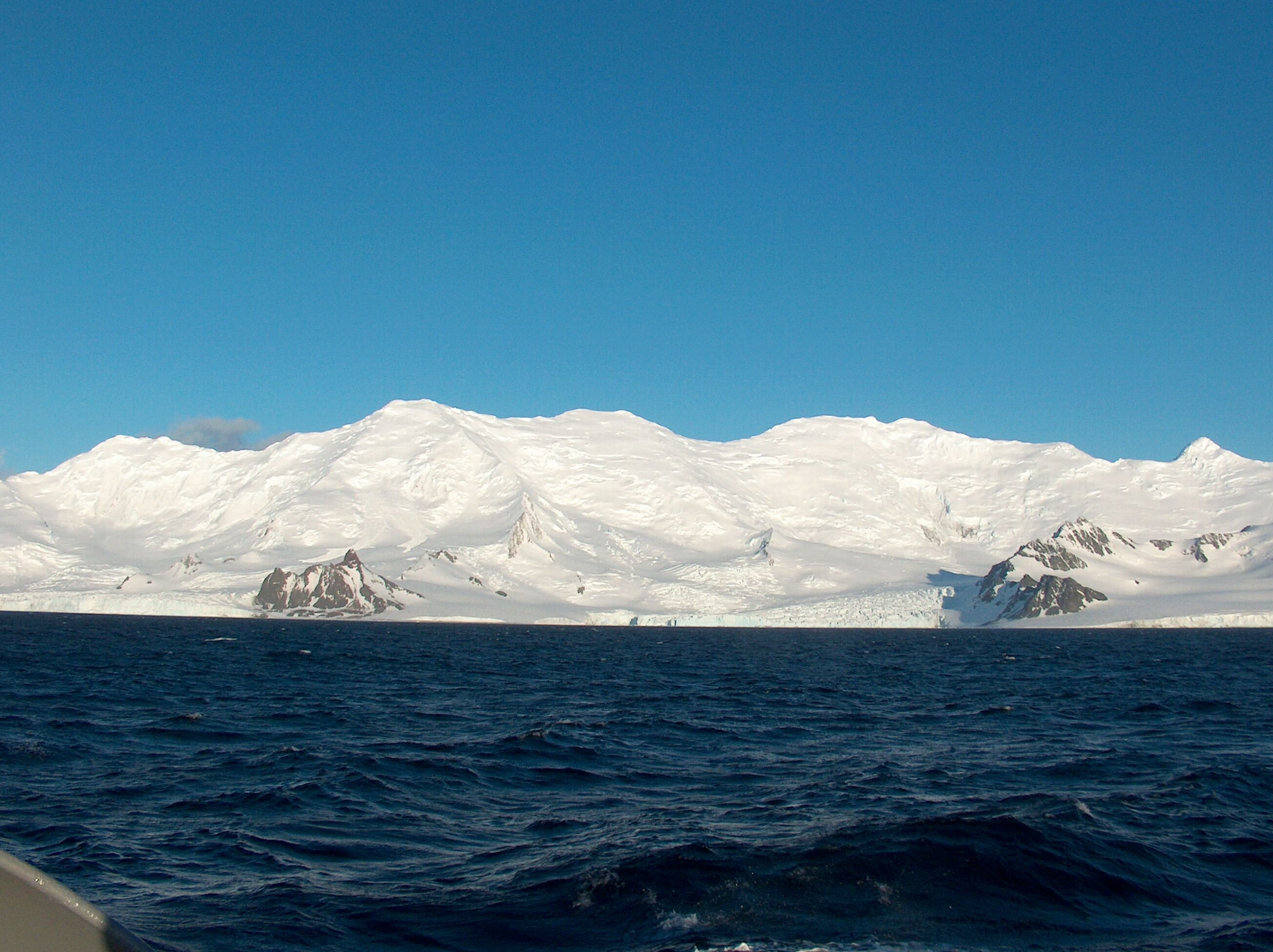
Friesland Ridge from Bransfield Strait; left to right St. Methodius Peak, St. Cyril Peak, Simeon Peak, Paril Saddle, St. Boris Peak, Mount Friesland, Presian Ridge, Catalunyan Saddle and Lyaskovets Peak

== Notes ==
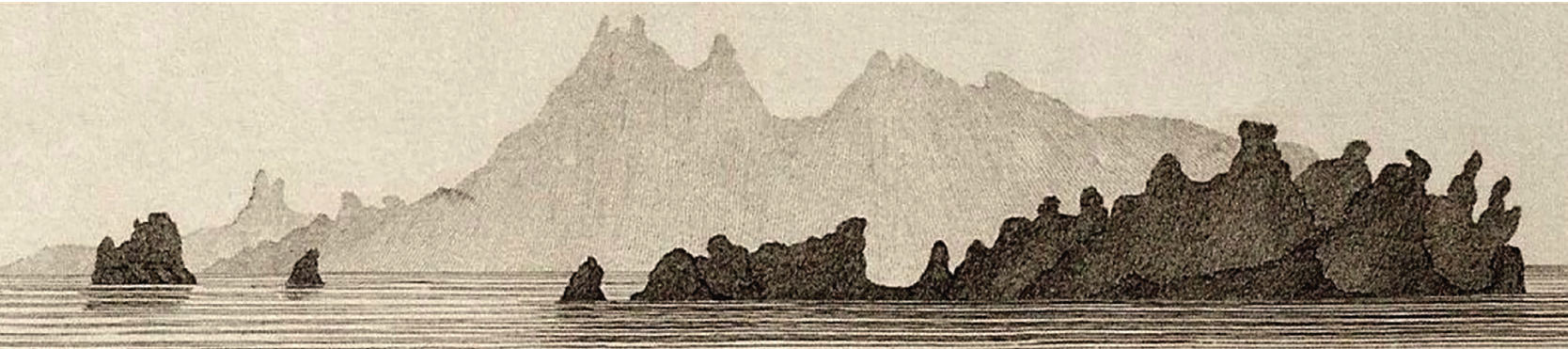
North view of Tangra Mountains depicting (left to right) Great Needle Peak, Levski Peak, Lyaskovets Peak, Mount Friesland, St. Boris Peak and Simeon Peak, with Desolation Island in the foreground; fragment of an illustration to George Powell's 1822 chart of the South Shetland and South Orkney Islands
