= Mount Friesland =

Mountain in the South Shetland Islands, Antarctica

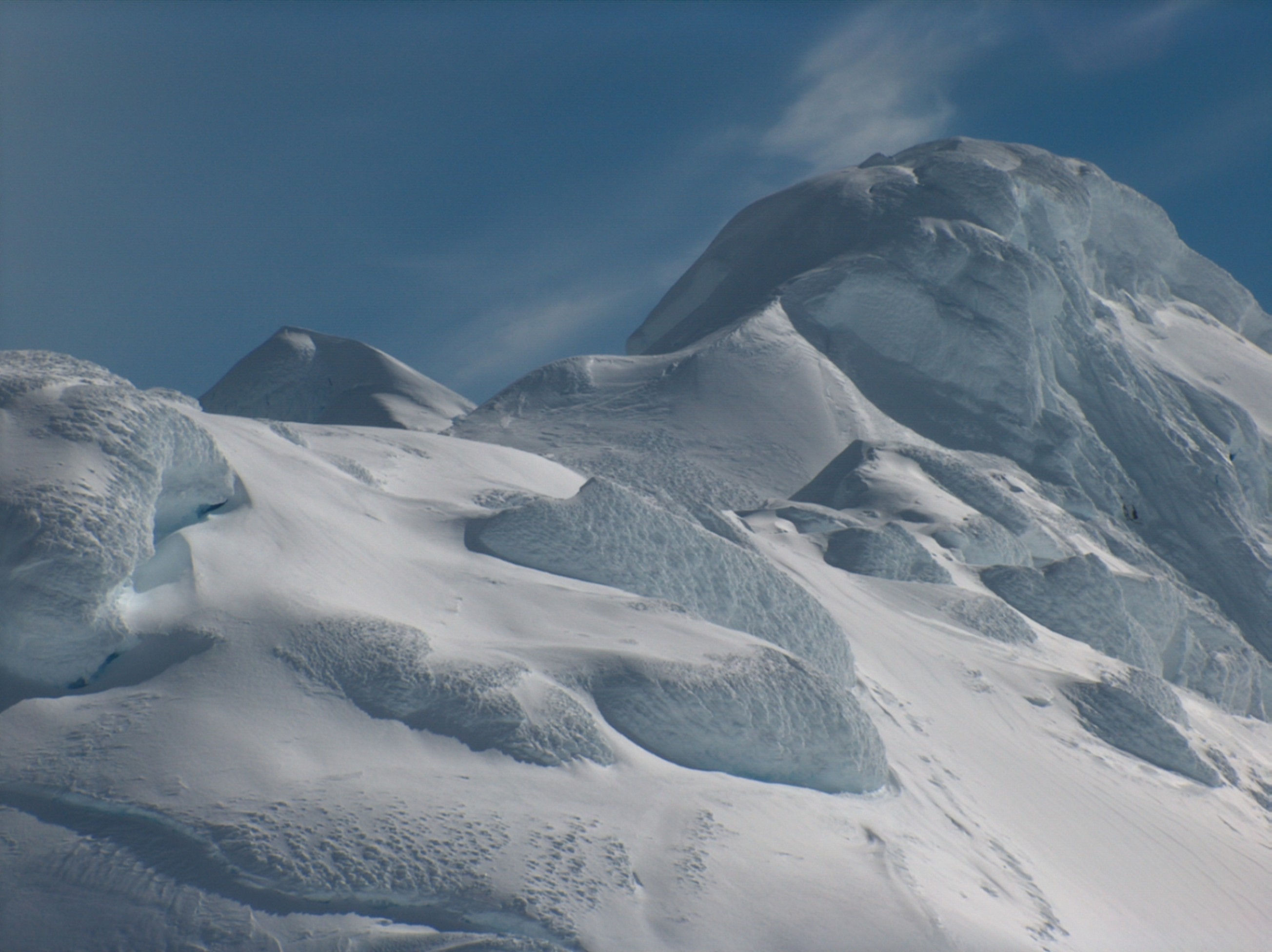
- Mount Friesland from the west slopes of Lyaskovets Peak, with Presian Ridge in the foreground and ‘The Synagogue’ in the left background

Highest point
- Elevation: 1,700.2 m (5,578 ft)
- Prominence: 1,700.2 m (5,578 ft)
- Listing: Ultra, Ribu
- Coordinates: 62°40′14.9″S 60°11′10.7″W

Geography
- Location within Antarctica
- Location: Livingston Island, South Shetland Islands, Antarctica
- Parent range: Tangra Mountains

Climbing
- First ascent: 30 December 1991 Francesc Sàbat and Jordi Enrique

Mount Friesland is a mountain rising to 1,700.2 metres (5,578 ft) in the homonymous Friesland Ridge, one of the two summits of Tangra Mountains and Livingston Island in the South Shetland Islands, Antarctica along with neighbouring St. Boris Peak. Its north rib is connected to Pliska Ridge by Nesebar Gap on the west, and to Bowles Ridge by Wörner Gap on the north. On the east, Mount Friesland is connected to Presian Ridge and further on to Catalunyan Saddle and Lyaskovets Peak. On the south-southwest, it is connected by a short saddle to ‘The Synagogue’, a sharp-peaked rock-cored ice formation abutting St. Boris Peak. The peak is heavily glaciated and crevassed, surmounting Huntress Glacier to the west, Perunika Glacier to the north-northwest, Huron Glacier to the northeast and Macy Glacier to the southeast. The local weather is notoriously unpleasant and challenging; according to the seasoned Antarctic mountaineer Damien Gildea who climbed in the area, "just about the worst weather in the world".

== History ==
The feature was known to American and British sealers as early as 1820–21, and variously referred to as "Peak of Frezeland", "Friezland Peak", and "Friesland Peak". In the early 1900s the name "Barnard", applied by James Weddell in 1825 to nearby Needle Peak, was transferred to this mountain. The original name has now been restored with the spelling "Friesland" that appears to have been more frequently used than any of the other versions. In order to preserve the historical memory of the area, the name Barnard Point has since been approved for the nearby point on the southeast side of the entrance to False Bay.

The first ascent of Mount Friesland was made from Juan Carlos I Base on 30 December 1991 by the Catalan climbers Francesc Sàbat and Jordi Enrique, after whom Sàbat Hill and Enrique Hill, respectively, were named. The peak was climbed and GPS surveyed by the Australian Damien Gildea and John Bath, and the Chilean Rodrigo Fica on 20 December 2003, who produced a new map of the island in 2004, based on Spanish satellite imagery and their GPS data. The third ascent was made by the Bulgarians Lyubomir Ivanov and Doychin Vasilev from Camp Academia on 15 December 2004. All these used the Sàbat–Enrique eastern route to the peak, from Camp Academia locality (541 m) via Catalunyan Saddle (1,260 m) and Presian Ridge (1,456 m).

== Elevation ==
The summit elevation was estimated at 1,684 metres (5,525 ft) by a 1995–96 Bulgarian survey; the present figure was produced by a 2003 Australian GPS survey, and closely matched (as 1,702 metres (5,584 ft)) by the Bulgarian survey Tangra 2004/05. The local ice relief is subject to changes, causing variations in the feature's elevation. According to a Bulgarian GPS survey by D. Boyanov and N. Petkov the elevation of Mt. Friesland was 1,693 metres (5,554 ft) in December 2016, making the peak lower than the adjacent St. Boris Peak (the latter's northernmost ice formation ‘The Synagogue’ rising to 1,699 metres (5,574 ft)) at that time. According to the American high accuracy Reference Elevation Model of Antarctica (REMA), Mount Friesland is 8 m (26 ft) higher than the central summit of St. Boris Peak and 14 m (46 ft) higher than ‘The Synagogue’. However, according to the 2022 later edition of REMA Mount Friesland is 4 m (13 ft) higher than the central summit of St. Boris Peak and 7 m (23 ft) lower than ‘The Synagogue’.

== Location ==
Mount Friesland is situated 12.5 kilometres (7.8 mi) northeast of Barnard Point, 9.7 kilometres (6.0 mi) east-southeast of St. Kliment Ohridski Base, 3.6 kilometres (2.2 mi) southeast of the summit of Pliska Ridge, 6.1 kilometres (3.8 mi) south by east of Mount Bowles, 2.9 kilometres (1.8 mi) south-southwest of Camp Academia, 6.7 kilometres (4.2 mi) west of Great Needle Peak, and 6.85 kilometres (4.26 mi) north by west of Samuel Point. British mapping in 1968, Chilean in 1971, Argentine in 1980, Spanish in 1991, US in 2004, and Bulgarian in 1996, 2005, 2009 and 2023. Bulgarian surveys 1995/96 (estimated elevation 1,684 m), 2004/05 and 2016/17.

== Maps ==
- Chart of South Shetland including Coronation Island, &c. from the exploration of the sloop Dove in the years 1821 and 1822 by George Powell Commander of the same. Scale ca. 1:200000. London: Laurie, 1822
- South Shetland Islands. Scale 1:200000 topographic map. DOS 610 Sheet W 62 60. Tolworth, UK, 1968.
- Islas Livingston y Decepción. Mapa topográfico a escala 1:100000. Madrid: Servicio Geográfico del Ejército, 1991.
- L.L. Ivanov. Livingston Island: Central-Eastern Region. Scale 1:25000 topographic map. Sofia: Antarctic Place-names Commission of Bulgaria, 1996.
- S. Soccol, D. Gildea and J. Bath. Livingston Island, Antarctica. Scale 1:100000 satellite map. The Omega Foundation, USA, 2004.
- L.L. Ivanov et al., Antarctica: Livingston Island and Greenwich Island, South Shetland Islands (from English Strait to Morton Strait, with illustrations and ice-cover distribution), 1:100000 scale topographic map, Antarctic Place-names Commission of Bulgaria, Sofia, 2005
- L.L. Ivanov. Antarctica: Livingston Island and Greenwich, Robert, Snow and Smith Islands. Scale 1:120000 topographic map. Troyan: Manfred Wörner Foundation, 2010. ISBN 978-954-92032-9-5 (First edition 2009. ISBN 978-954-92032-6-4)
- Antarctic Digital Database (ADD). Scale 1:250000 topographic map of Antarctica. Scientific Committee on Antarctic Research (SCAR). Since 1993, regularly upgraded and updated.
- L.L. Ivanov. Antarctica: Livingston Island and Smith Island. Scale 1:100000 topographic map. Manfred Wörner Foundation, 2017. ISBN 978-619-90008-3-0
- A. Kamburov and L. Ivanov. Bowles Ridge and Central Tangra Mountains: Livingston Island, Antarctica. Scale 1:25000 map. Sofia: Manfred Wörner Foundation, 2023. ISBN 978-619-90008-6-1

== See also ==
- List of Ultras of Antarctica
- Tangra Mountains
- South Shetland Islands

== Gallery ==
Topographic map of Livingston Island and Smith Island

Location of Tangra Mountains on Livingston Island in the South Shetland Islands

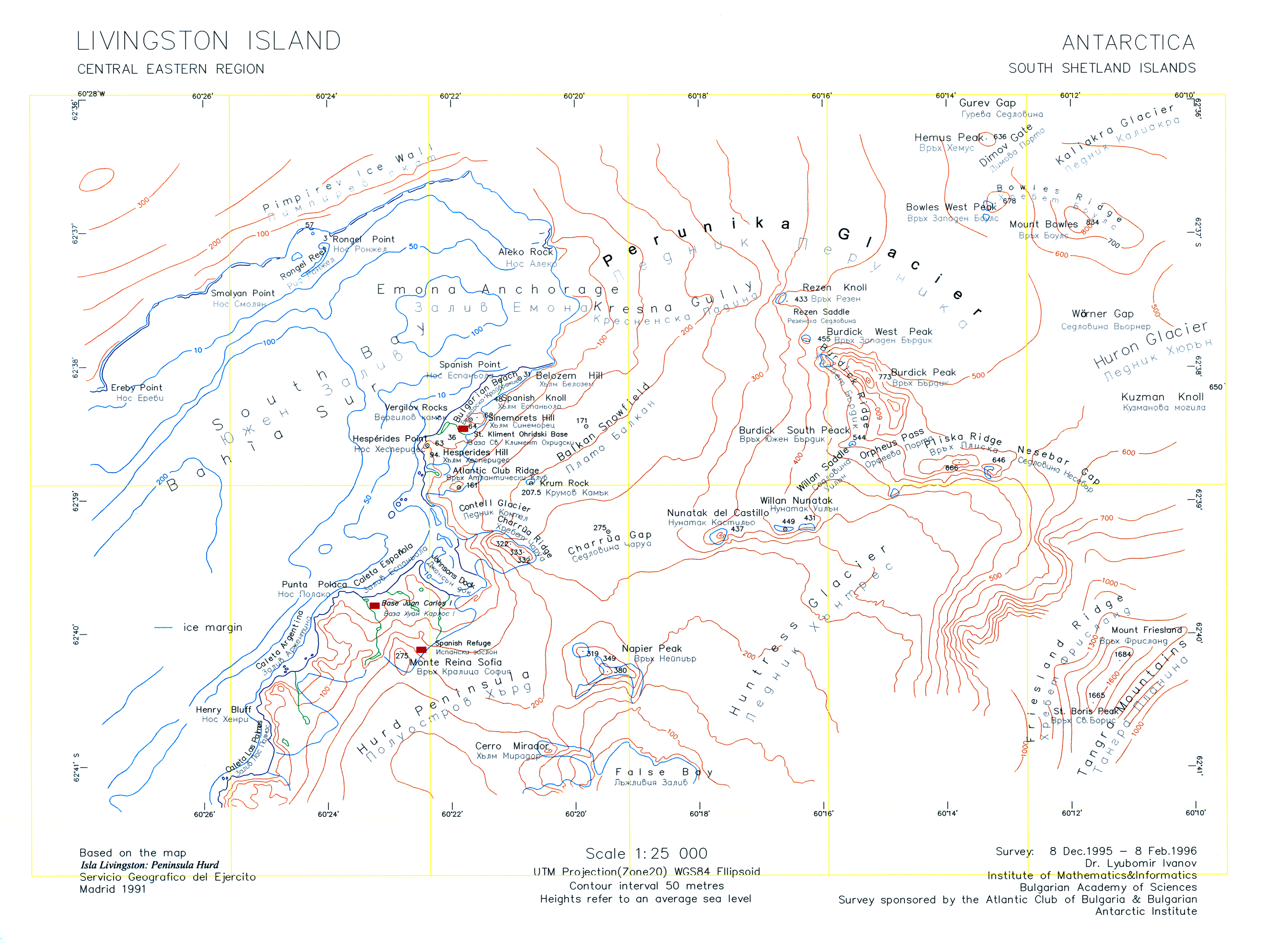
Topographic map of central-eastern Livingston Island featuring Mount Friesland

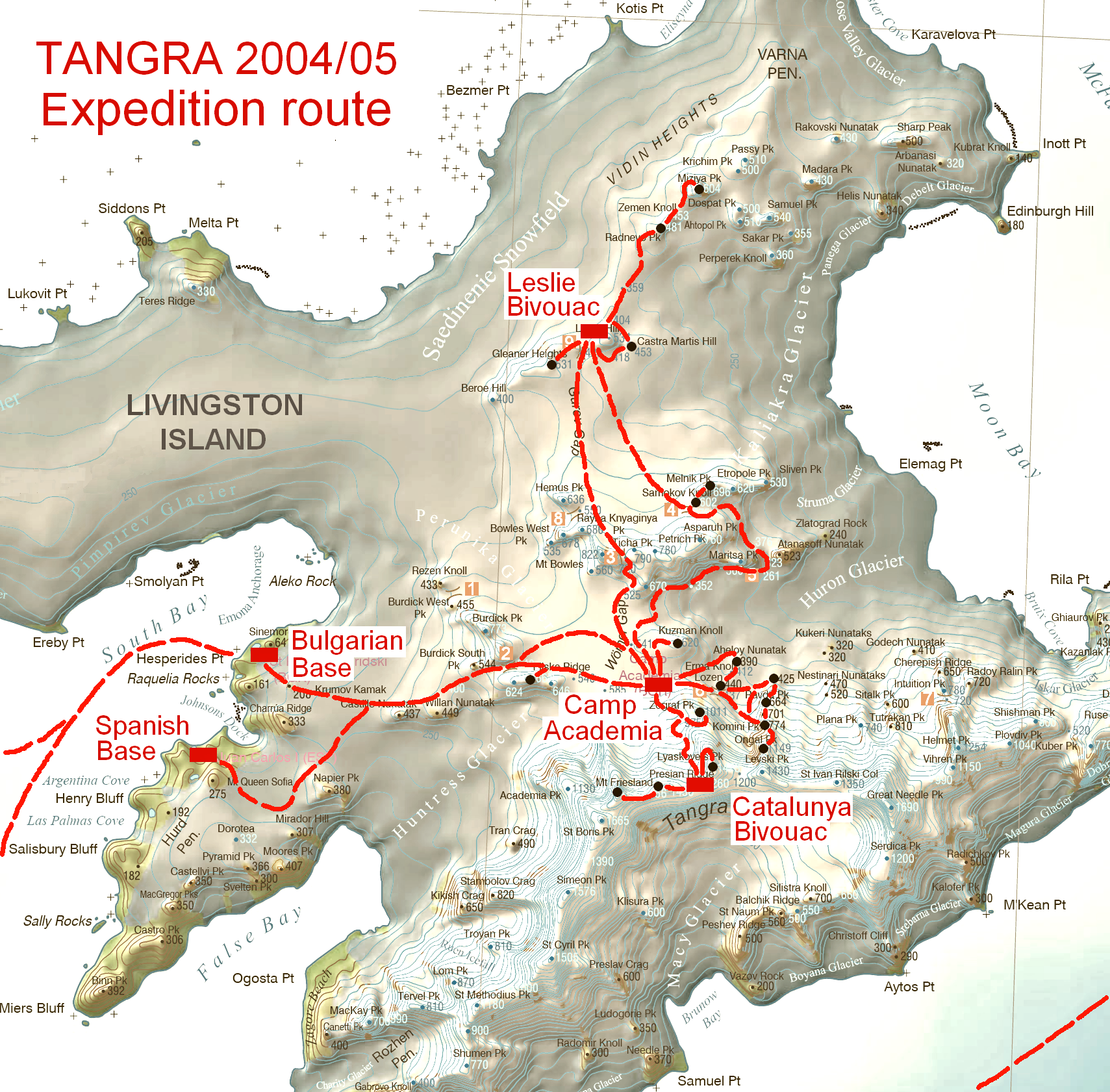
The survey route of Tangra 2004/05 including Mount Friesland

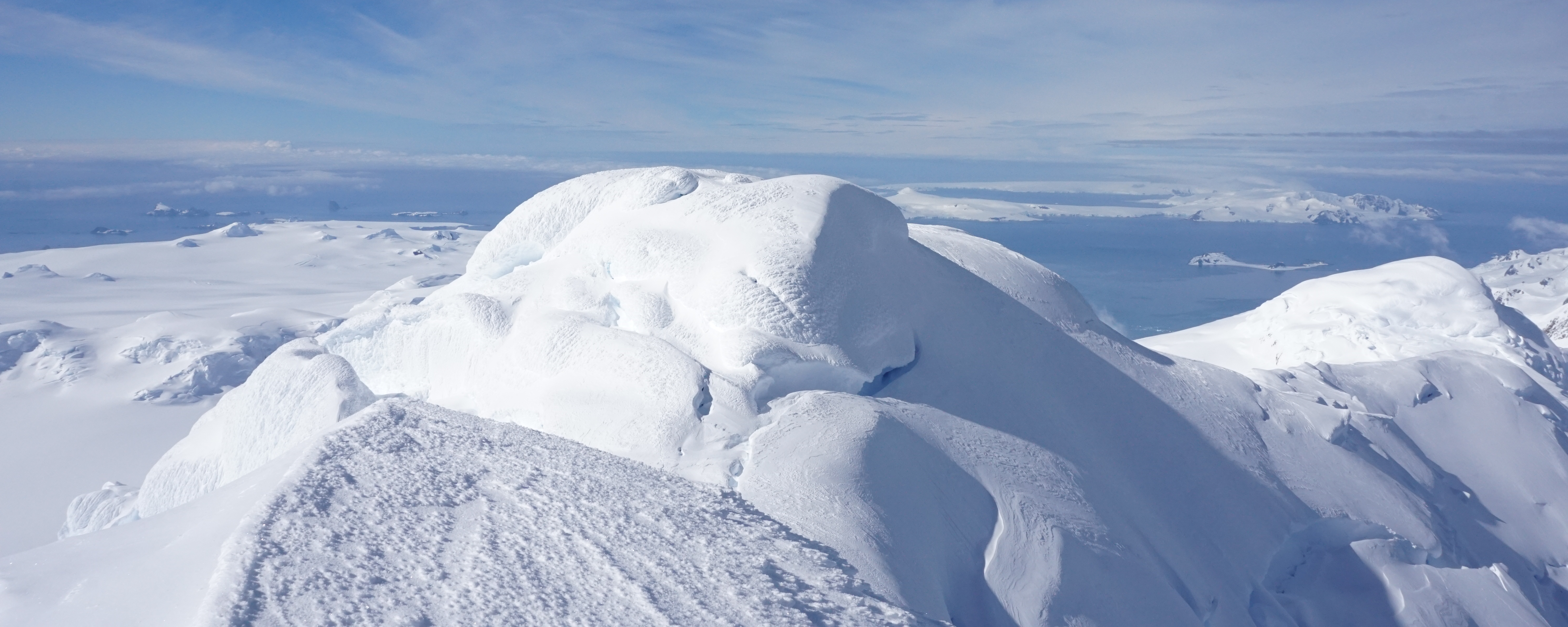
Panoramic northeast view from St. Boris Peak centred on Mount Friesland

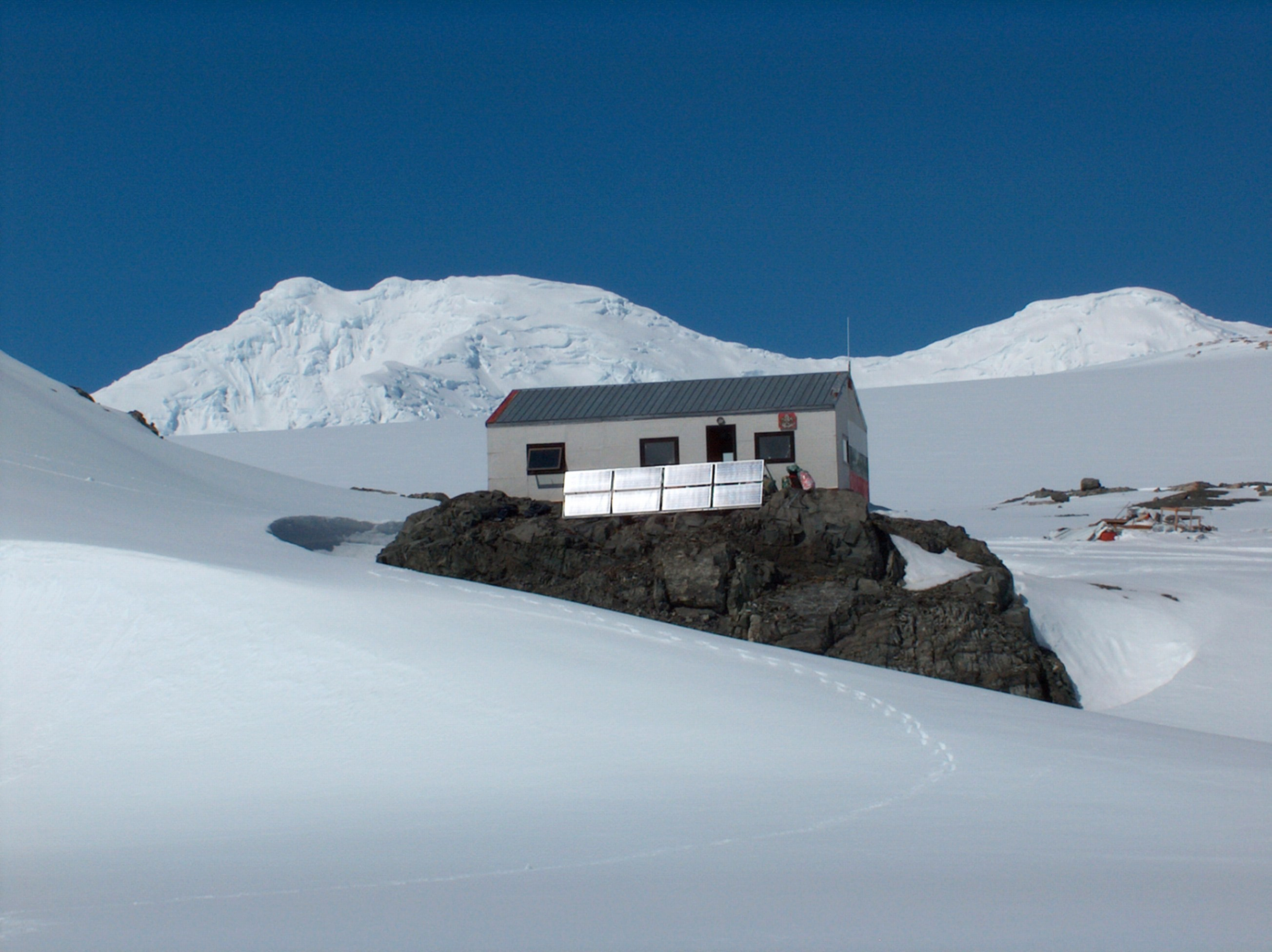
The main building of St. Kliment Ohridski Base, with Balkan Snowfield in the middle, and (left to right) Mount Friesland, St. Boris Peak and Simeon Peak in the background

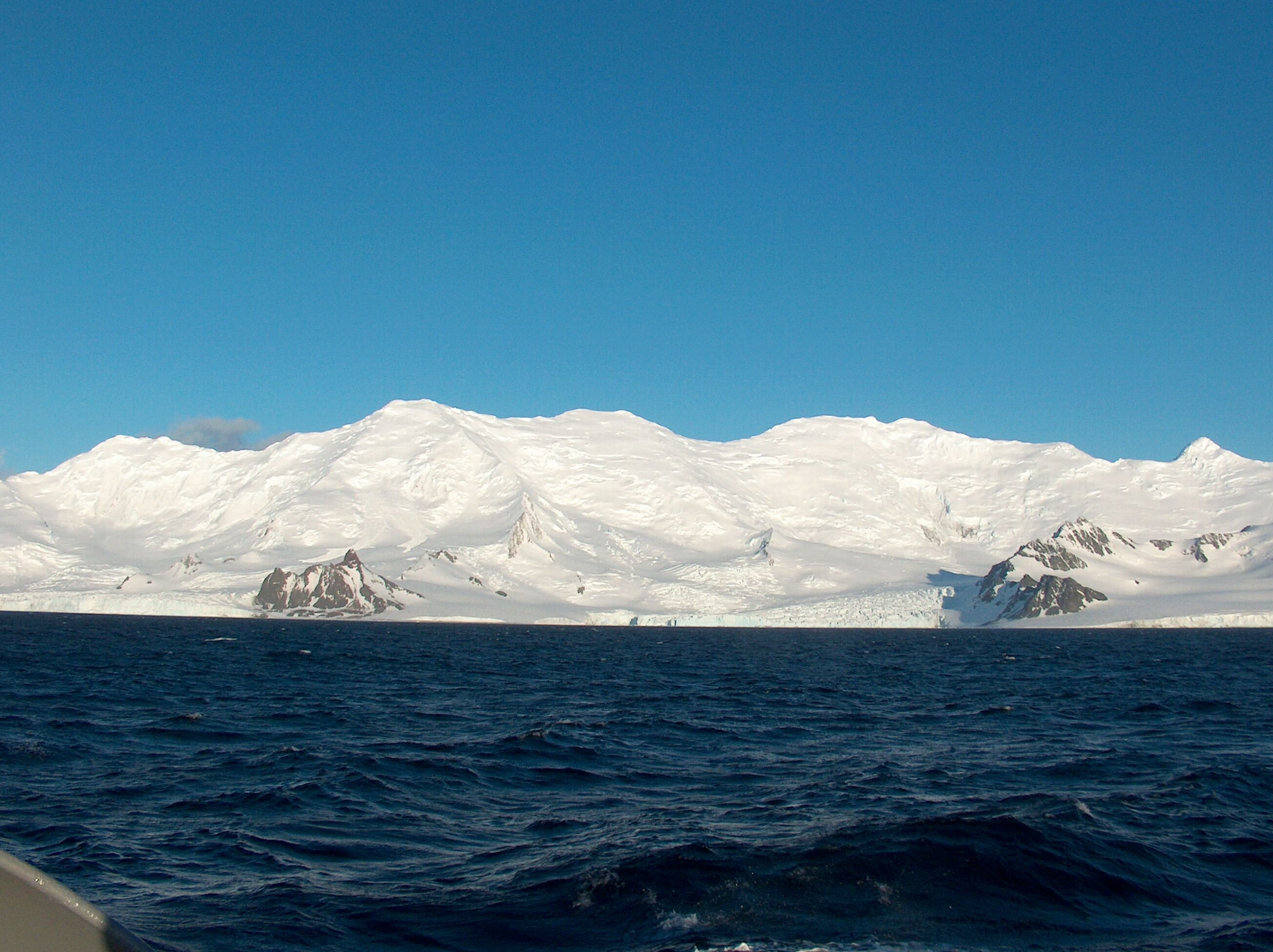
Friesland Ridge from Bransfield Strait, with St. Methodius Peak, St. Cyril Peak, Simeon Peak, St. Boris Peak, Mount Friesland and Lyaskovets Peak in the background, and Needle Peak, Macy Glacier and Peshev Ridge in the foreground

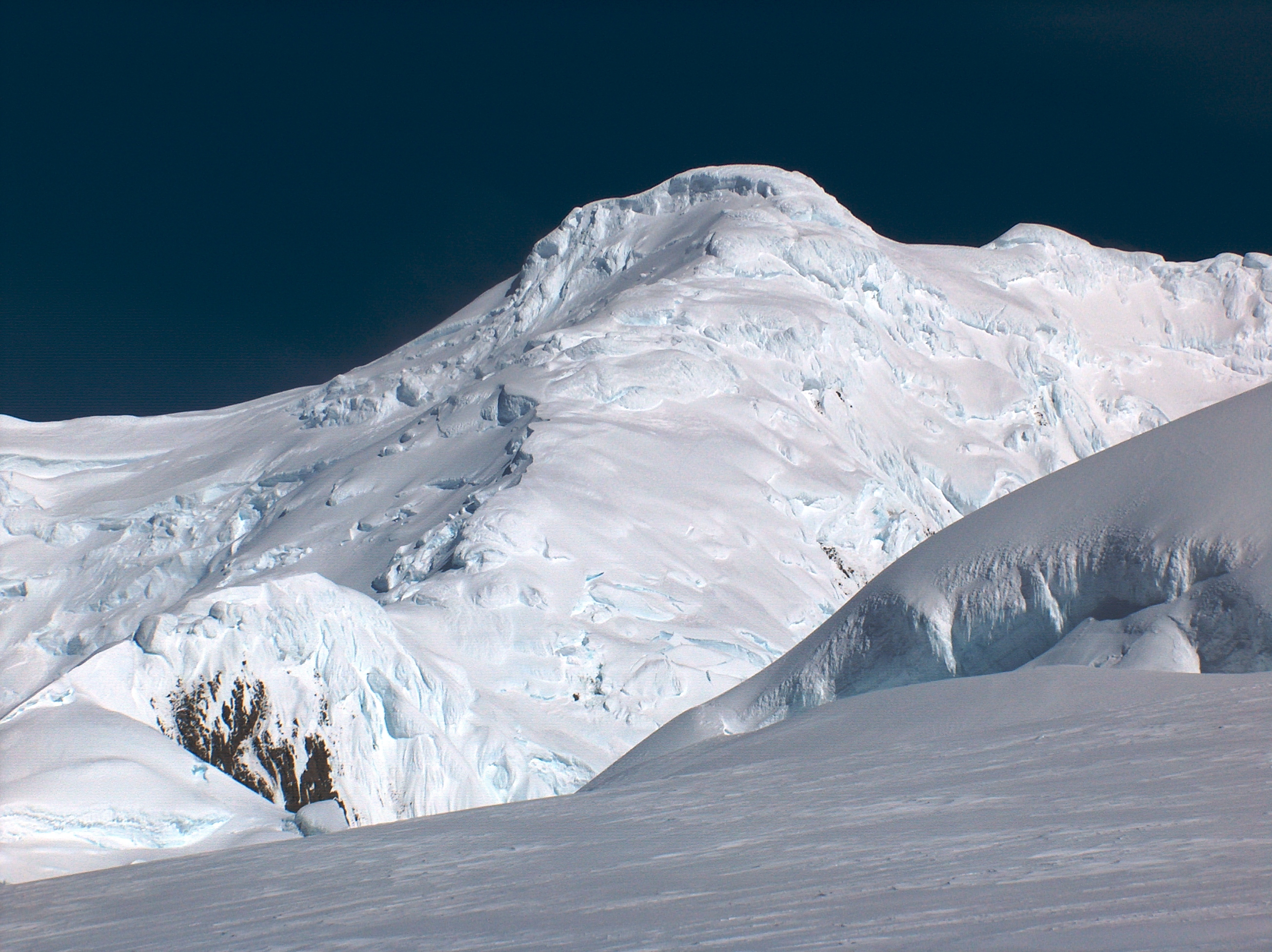
Mount Friesland from upper Perunika Glacier near Orpheus Gate, with Pliska Ridge on the right

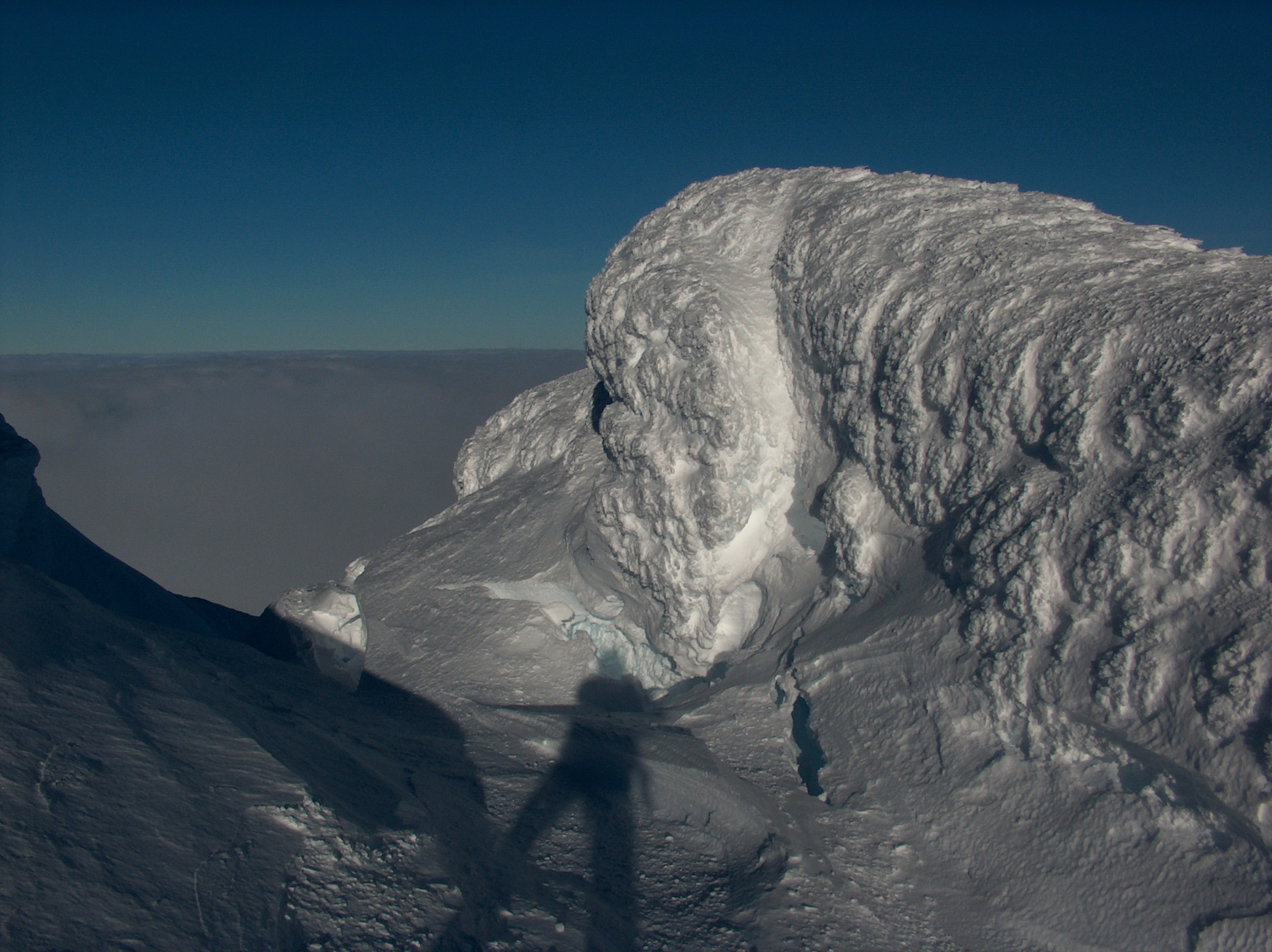
The summit of Mount Friesland, with the open extension of a partially hidden crevasse

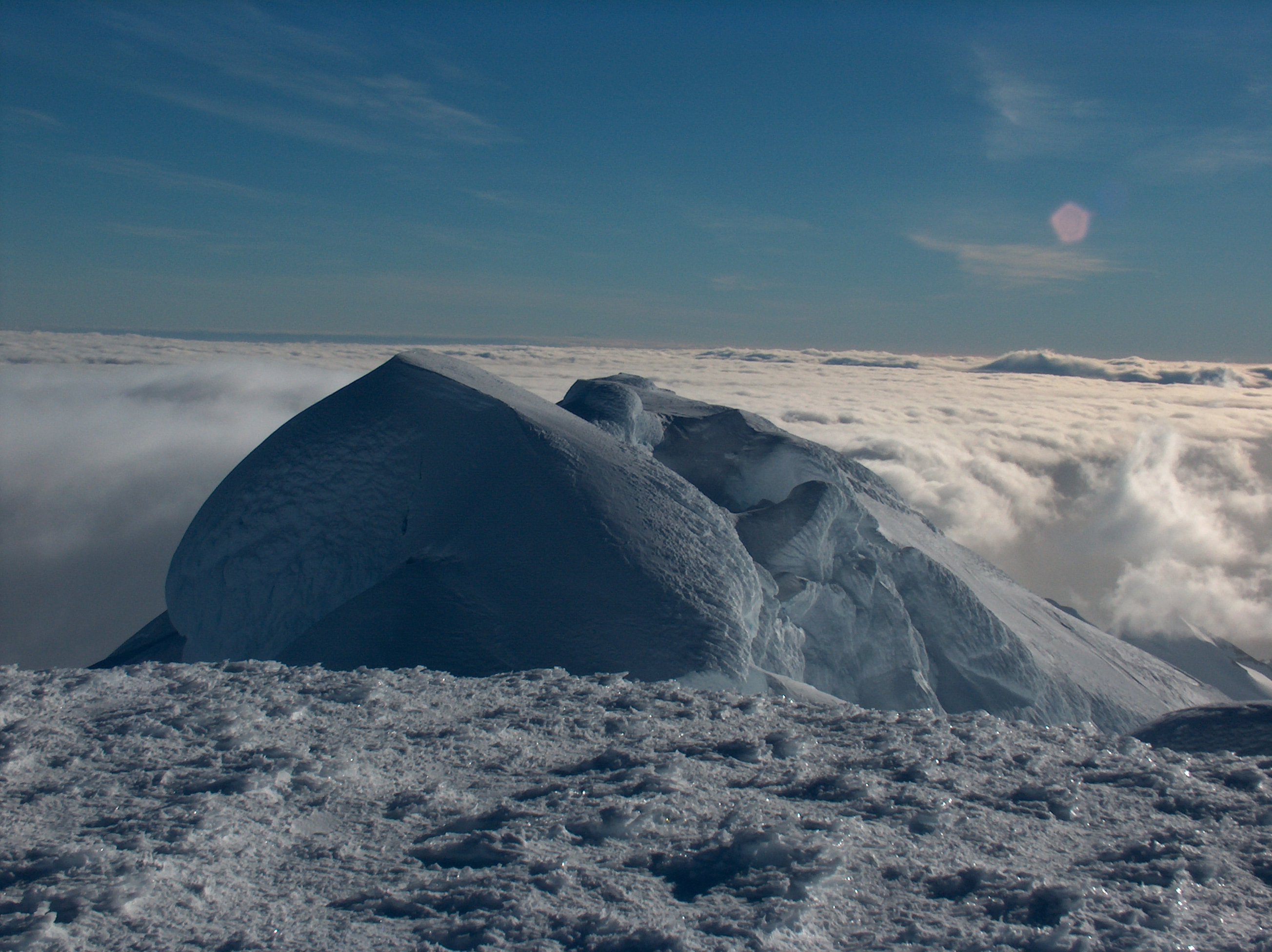
St. Boris Peak from Mount Friesland, with ‘The Synagogue’ ice form in the foreground

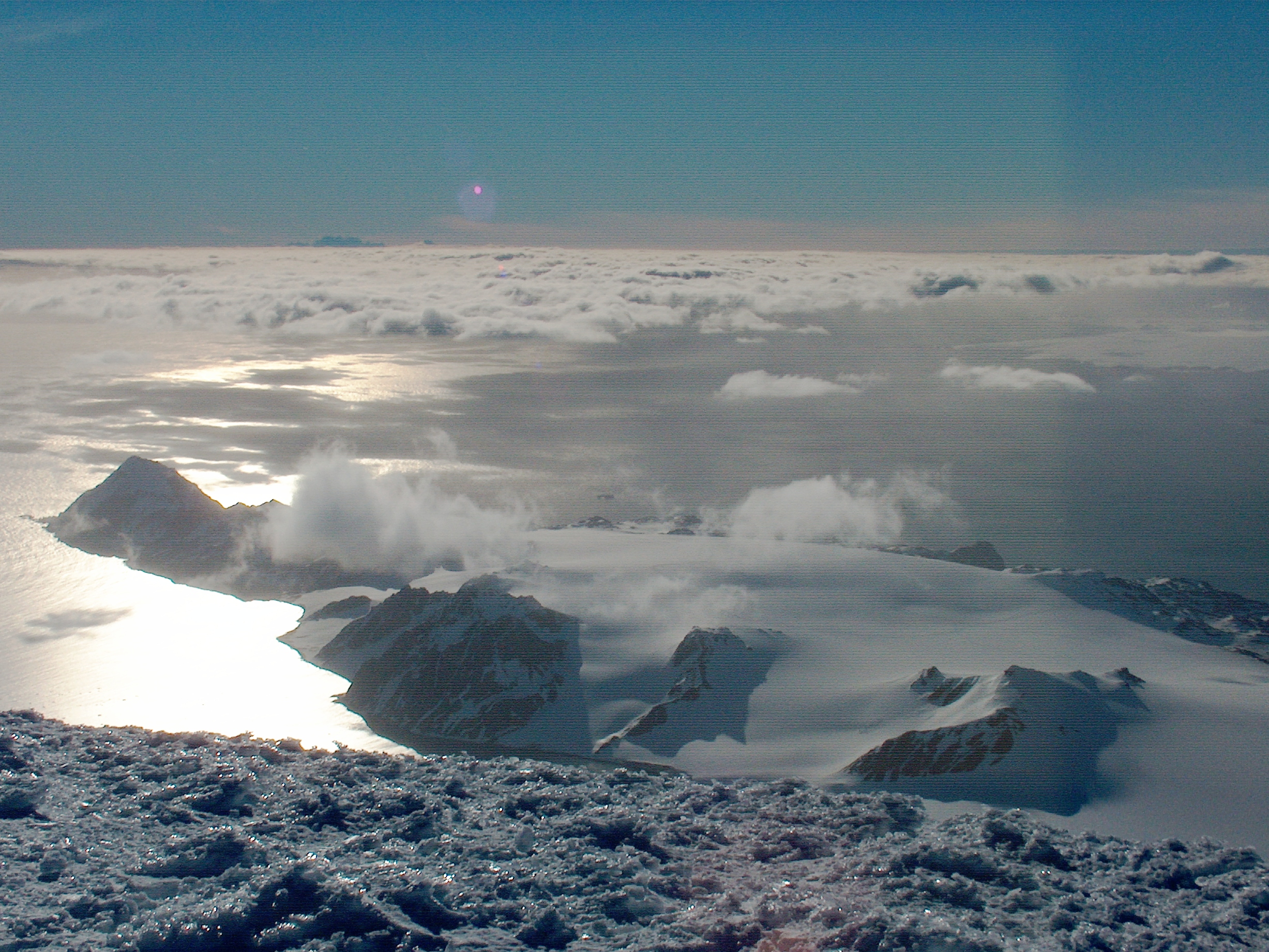
Southern Hurd Peninsula from Mount Friesland, with False Bay on the left and South Bay on the right, and Smith Island seen on the horizon

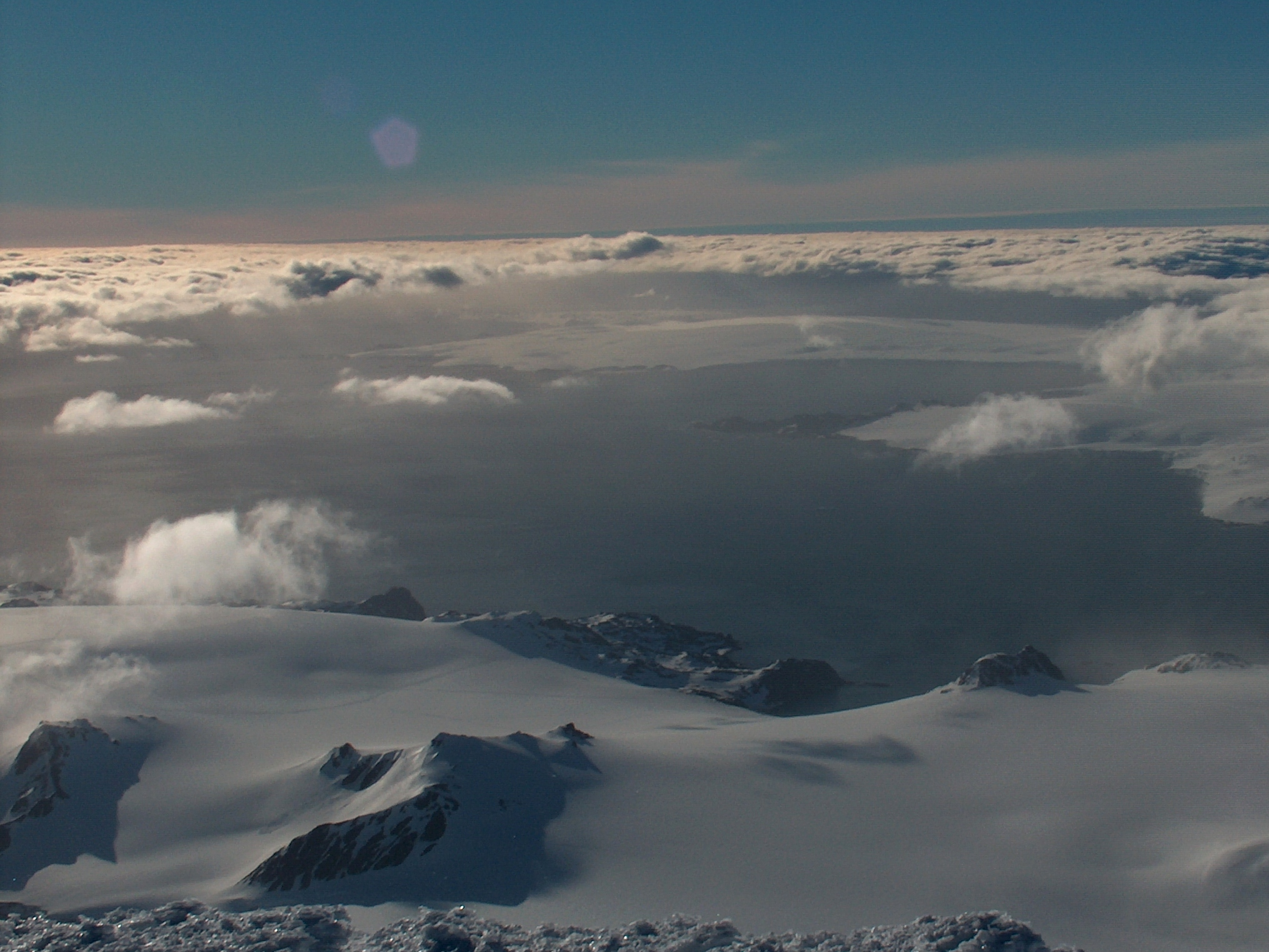
The Spanish base area from Mount Friesland, with Napier Peak and Johnsons Glacier in the foreground, Charrúa Ridge on the right and Mount Reina Sofia in the background, and South Bay, Hannah Point and western Livingston Island farther away

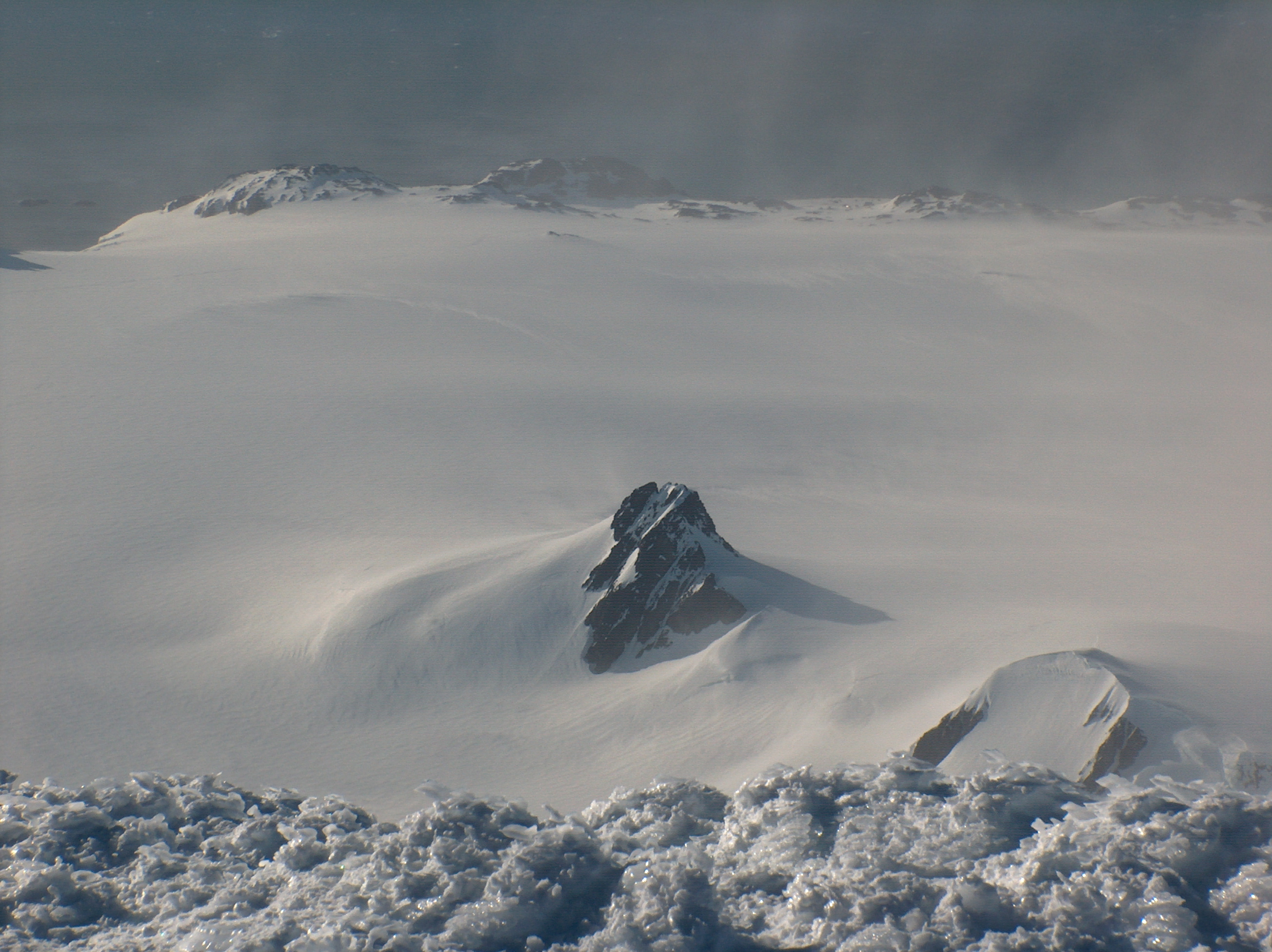
Bulgarian Beach from Mount Friesland, with Castillo Nunatak and Willan Nunatak in the foreground, Balkan Snowfield in the middle, and left to right in the background Atlantic Club Ridge, Hesperides Hill, Pesyakov Hill and Sinemorets Hill with the Bulgarian base in between, and Spanish Knoll

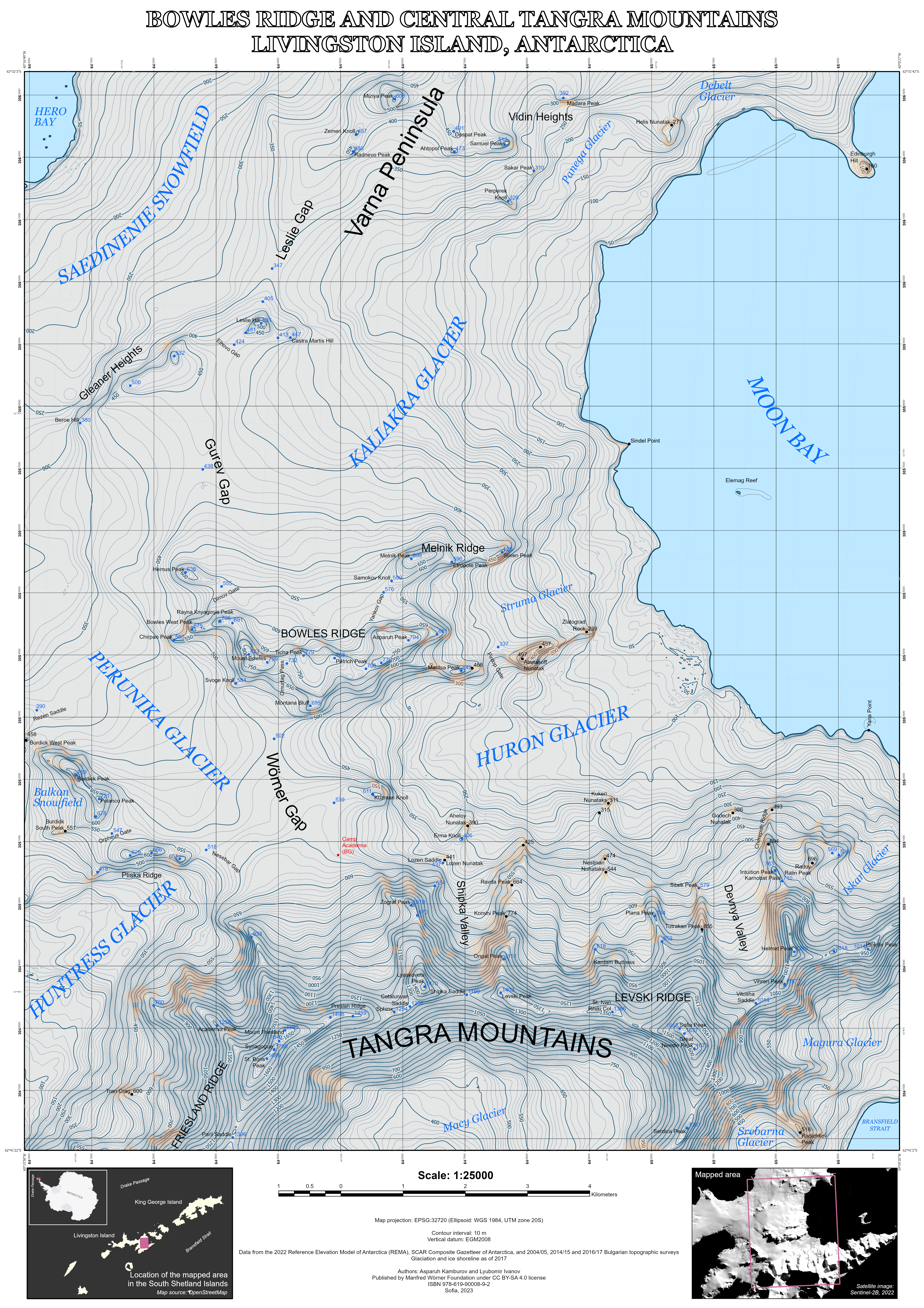
Topographic map of Bowles Ridge and Central Tangra Mountains featuring Mount Friesland

== Notes ==
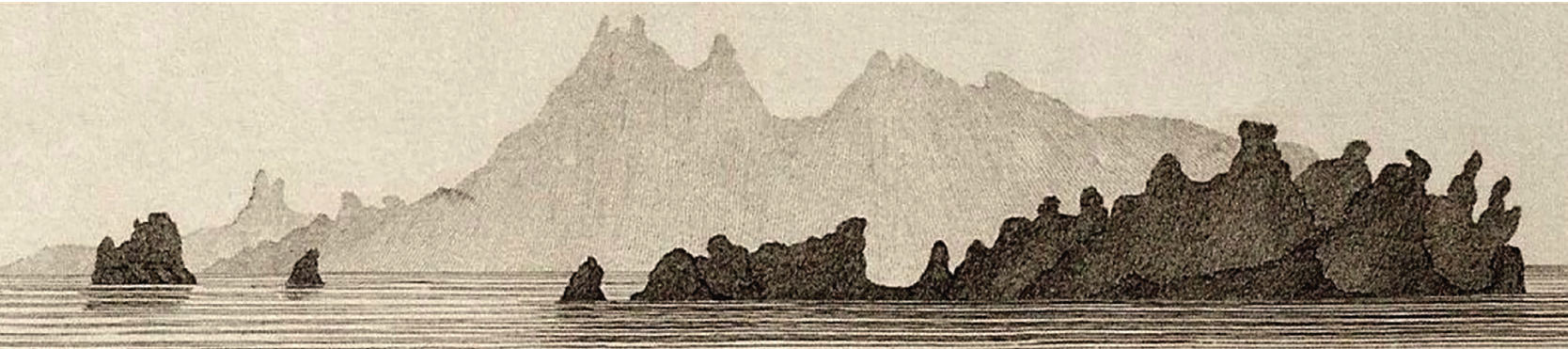
North view of Tangra Mountains depicting (left to right) Great Needle Peak, Levski Peak, Lyaskovets Peak, Mount Friesland, St. Boris Peak and Simeon Peak, with Desolation Island in the foreground; fragment of an illustration to George Powell's 1822 chart of the South Shetland and South Orkney Islands
