= St. Boris Peak =

Mountain in the South Shetland Islands, Antarctica

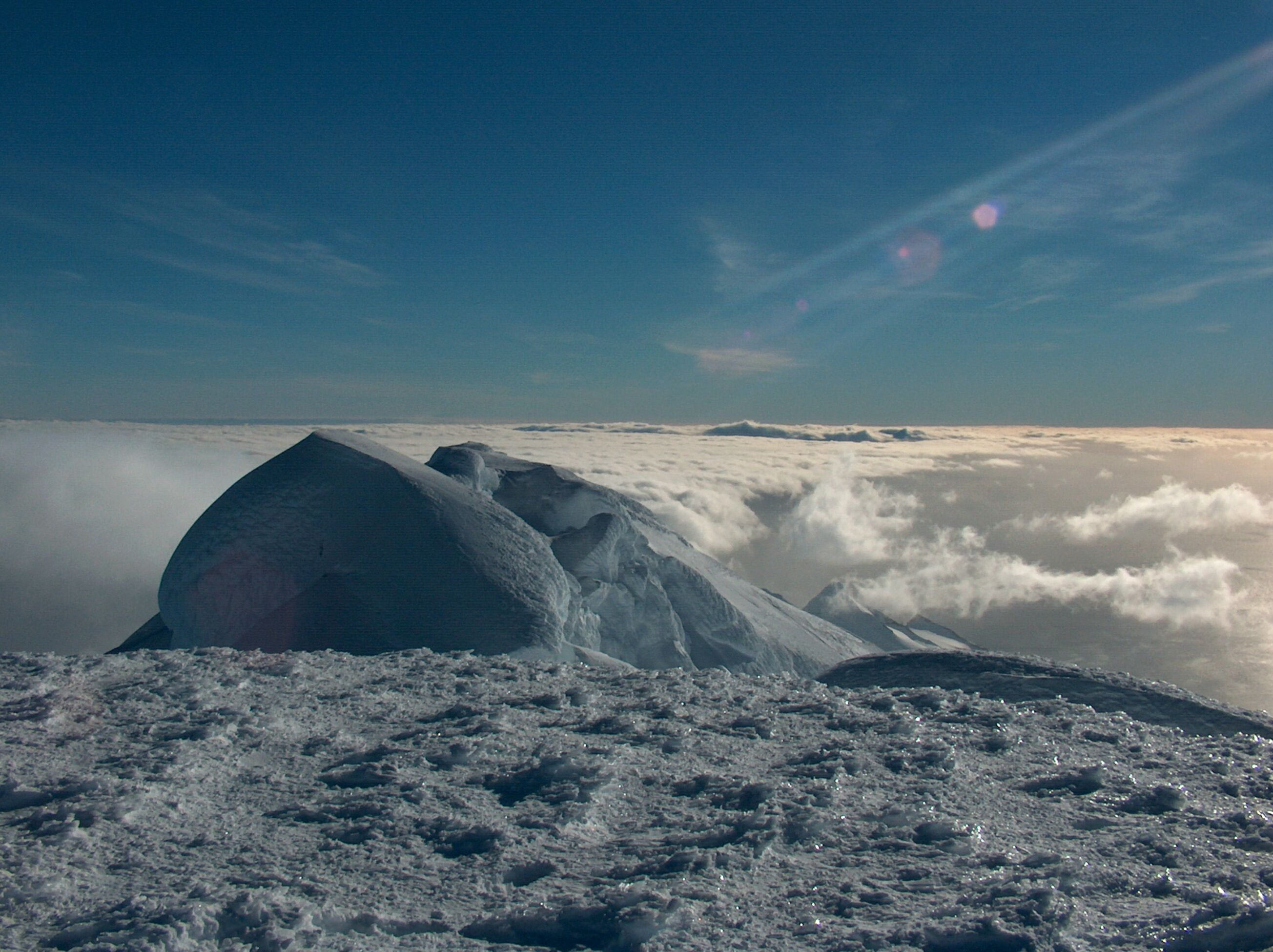
- St. Boris Peak from neighbouring Mount Friesland, with 'The Synagogue' in the foreground.

Highest point
- Elevation: 1,700 m (5,600 ft)

Geography
- Location of Tangra Mountains on Livingston Island in the South Shetland Islands
- Location: Livingston Island, South Shetland Islands, Antarctica
- Parent range: Tangra Mountains

Climbing
- First ascent: 22 December 2016 Doychin Boyanov and Nikolay Petkov

St. Boris Peak (Bulgarian: връх Св. Борис, romanized: vrah Sv. Boris, IPA: [ˈvrɤx svɛˈti boˈris]) is an ice-covered mountain rising to 1,700 m in Friesland Ridge, Tangra Mountains on Livingston Island in the South Shetland Islands, Antarctica. It is the first or second highest peak of both the mountains and the island along with Mount Friesland (1,700.2 m). The two are connected by a short saddle of elevation 1,649 m dominated by ‘The Synagogue’, a sharp-peaked rock-cored ice formation abutting upon the central summit of St. Boris Peak. The peak is also connected to Simeon Peak by Paril Saddle, and surmounts Huntress Glacier to the northwest and west, and Macy Glacier to the southeast.

The peak's central summit is rising to 1,685 m, while its highest point ‘The Synagogue’ rises to 1,699 or 1,700 m. The local ice relief is subject to change; according to a Bulgarian GPS survey by D. Boyanov and N. Petkov the elevation of Mt. Friesland was 1,693 m in December 2016, making St. Boris Peak the summit of both Tangra Mountains and the island in that season. According to the American high accuracy Reference Elevation Model of Antarctica (REMA), Mount Friesland is 8 m (26 ft) higher than the central summit of St. Boris Peak and 14 m (46 ft) higher than ‘The Synagogue’. However, according to the 2022 later edition of REMA Mount Friesland is 4 m (13 ft) higher than the central summit of St. Boris Peak and 7 m (23 ft) lower than ‘The Synagogue’.

The peak was first ascended and GPS surveyed by the Bulgarians D. Boyanov and N. Petkov from Camp Academia area via Mount Friesland on 22 December 2016. A different route was followed by the same climbers and N. Hazarbasanov on 15 January 2017, namely from Nesebar Gap via upper Huntress Glacier and Academia Peak.

The feature is named after Czar St. Boris I of Bulgaria, 852-889 AD.

== Location ==
The central summit of the mountain is located at 62°40′32″S 60°11′33″W, which is 650 m south-southwest of Mount Friesland, 4.34 km northwest of Peshev Peak, 1.86 km north-northeast of Simeon Peak, 4.89 km southeast of Willan Nunatak and 3.85 km south-southeast of the summit of Pliska Ridge (Bulgarian topographic survey in 1995/96, and mapping in 1996, 2005 and 2009).

== St. Boris Peak cultural references ==
The naming of this Antarctic peak after a Bulgarian saint was reminded by the British press in connection with the victory of Boris Johnson in the London mayoral election on 2 May 2008, that particular day being St. Boris's Day in the Bulgarian Orthodox Church.

== Maps ==
- Chart of South Shetland including Coronation Island, &c. from the exploration of the sloop Dove in the years 1821 and 1822 by George Powell Commander of the same. Scale ca. 1:200000. London: Laurie, 1822
- South Shetland Islands. Scale 1:200000 topographic map. DOS 610 Sheet W 62 60. Tolworth, UK, 1968.
- L.L. Ivanov. Livingston Island: Central-Eastern Region. Scale 1:25000 topographic map. Sofia: Antarctic Place-names Commission of Bulgaria, 1996.
- L.L. Ivanov et al. Antarctica: Livingston Island and Greenwich Island, South Shetland Islands. Scale 1:100000 topographic map. Sofia: Antarctic Place-names Commission of Bulgaria, 2005.
- L.L. Ivanov. Antarctica: Livingston Island and Greenwich, Robert, Snow and Smith Islands. Scale 1:120000 topographic map. Troyan: Manfred Wörner Foundation, 2009. ISBN 978-954-92032-6-4
- Antarctic Digital Database (ADD). Scale 1:250000 topographic map of Antarctica. Scientific Committee on Antarctic Research (SCAR). Since 1993, regularly upgraded and updated.
- L.L. Ivanov. Antarctica: Livingston Island and Smith Island. Scale 1:100000 topographic map. Manfred Wörner Foundation, 2017. ISBN 978-619-90008-3-0
- A. Kamburov and L. Ivanov. Bowles Ridge and Central Tangra Mountains: Livingston Island, Antarctica. Scale 1:25000 map. Sofia: Manfred Wörner Foundation, 2023. ISBN 978-619-90008-6-1

== Gallery ==
Topographic map of Livingston Island and Smith Island

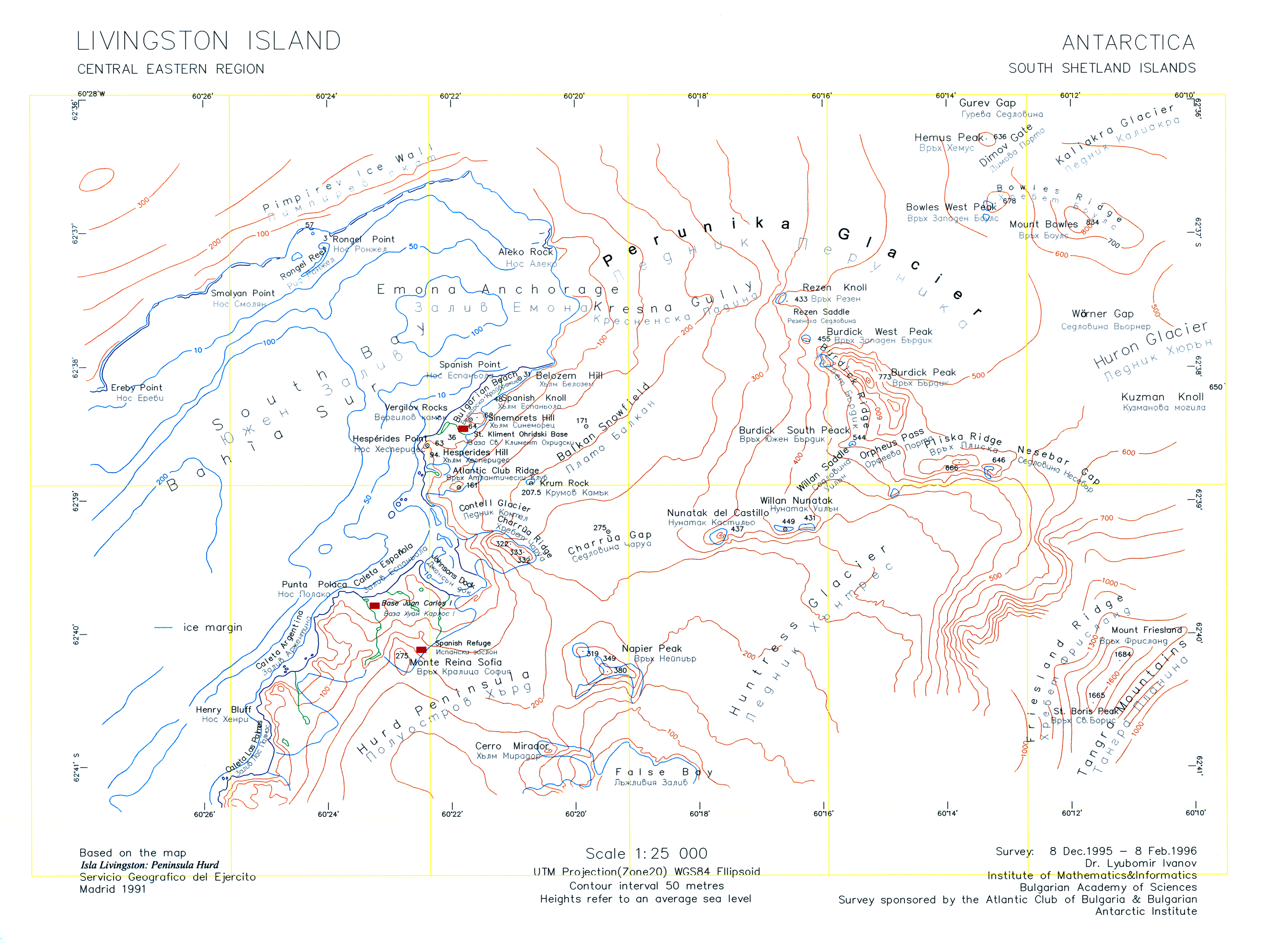
1996 topographic map, first mapping of St. Boris Peak

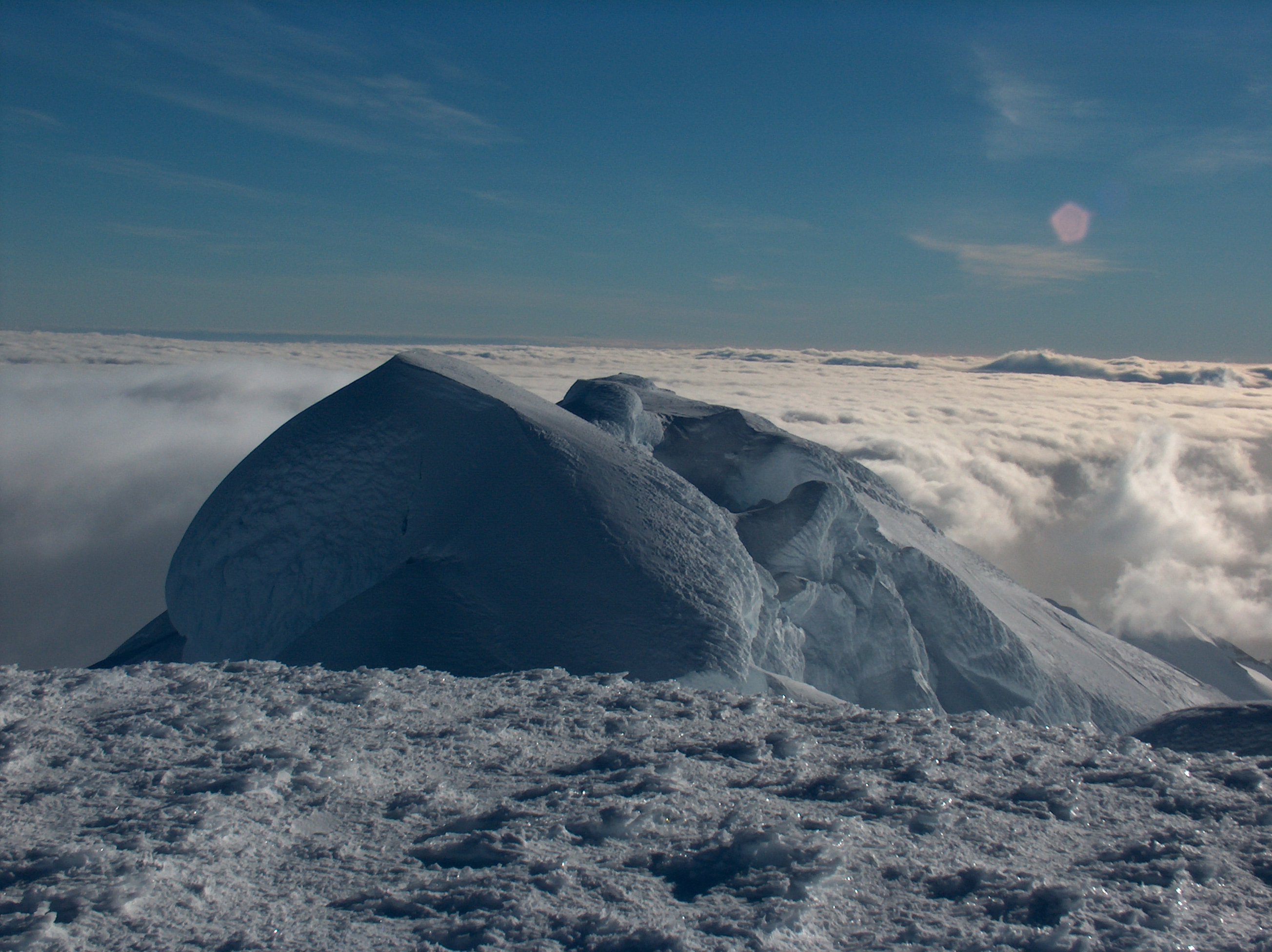
A close-up of St. Boris Peak from Mount Friesland

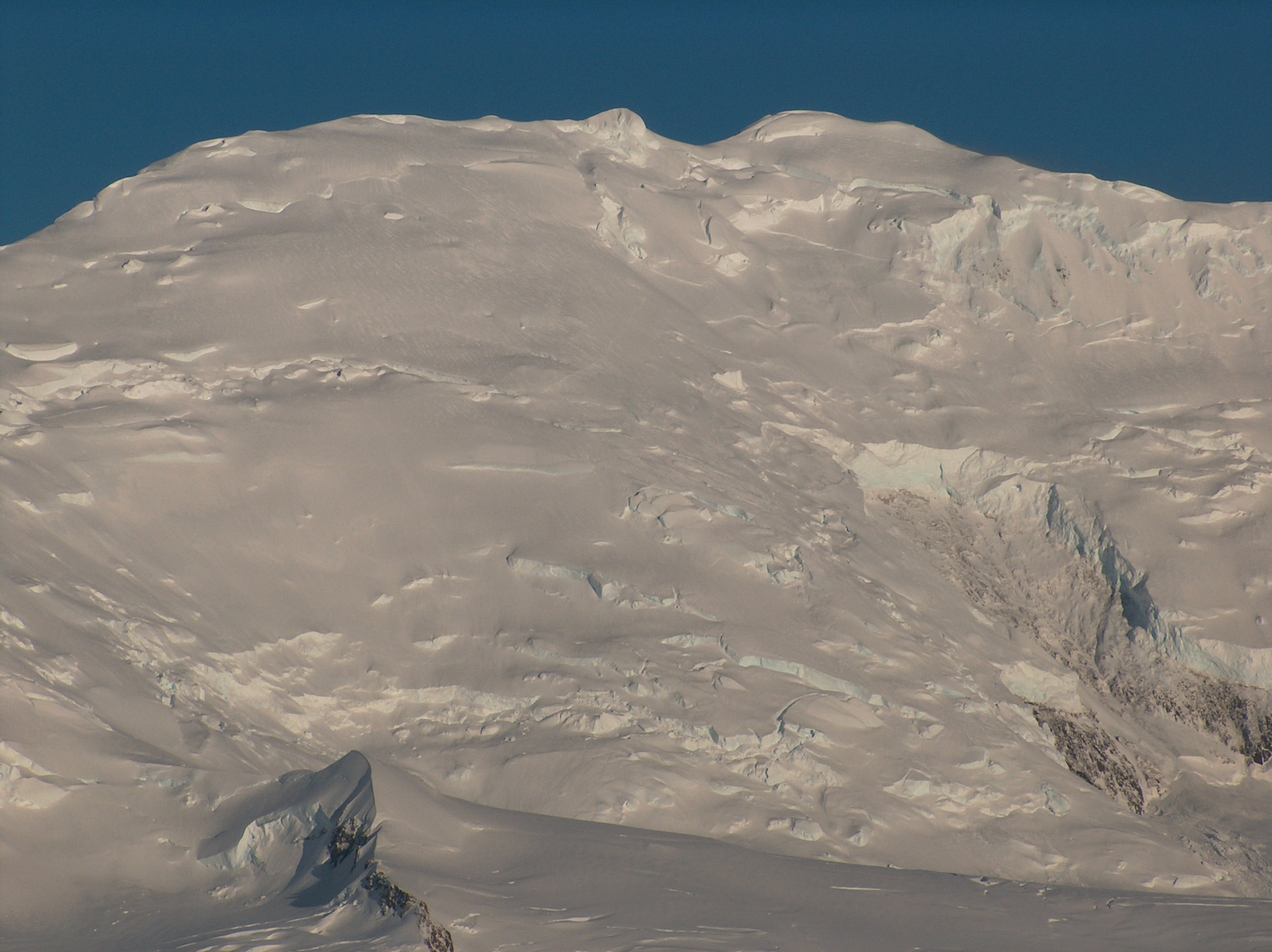
St. Boris Peak and Mount Friesland from Bransfield Strait

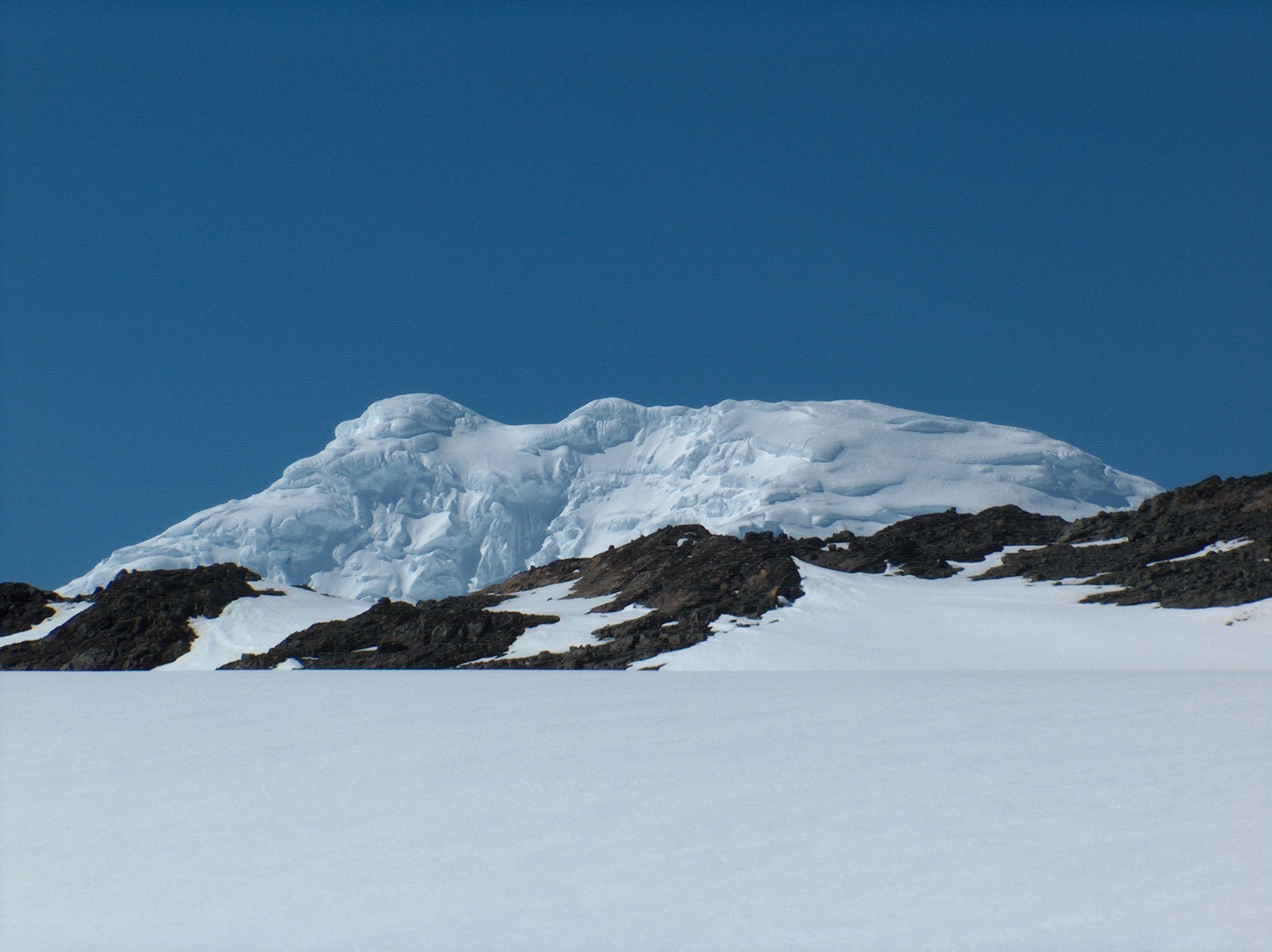
Mount Friesland and St. Boris Peak from the vicinity of St. Kliment Ohridski Base

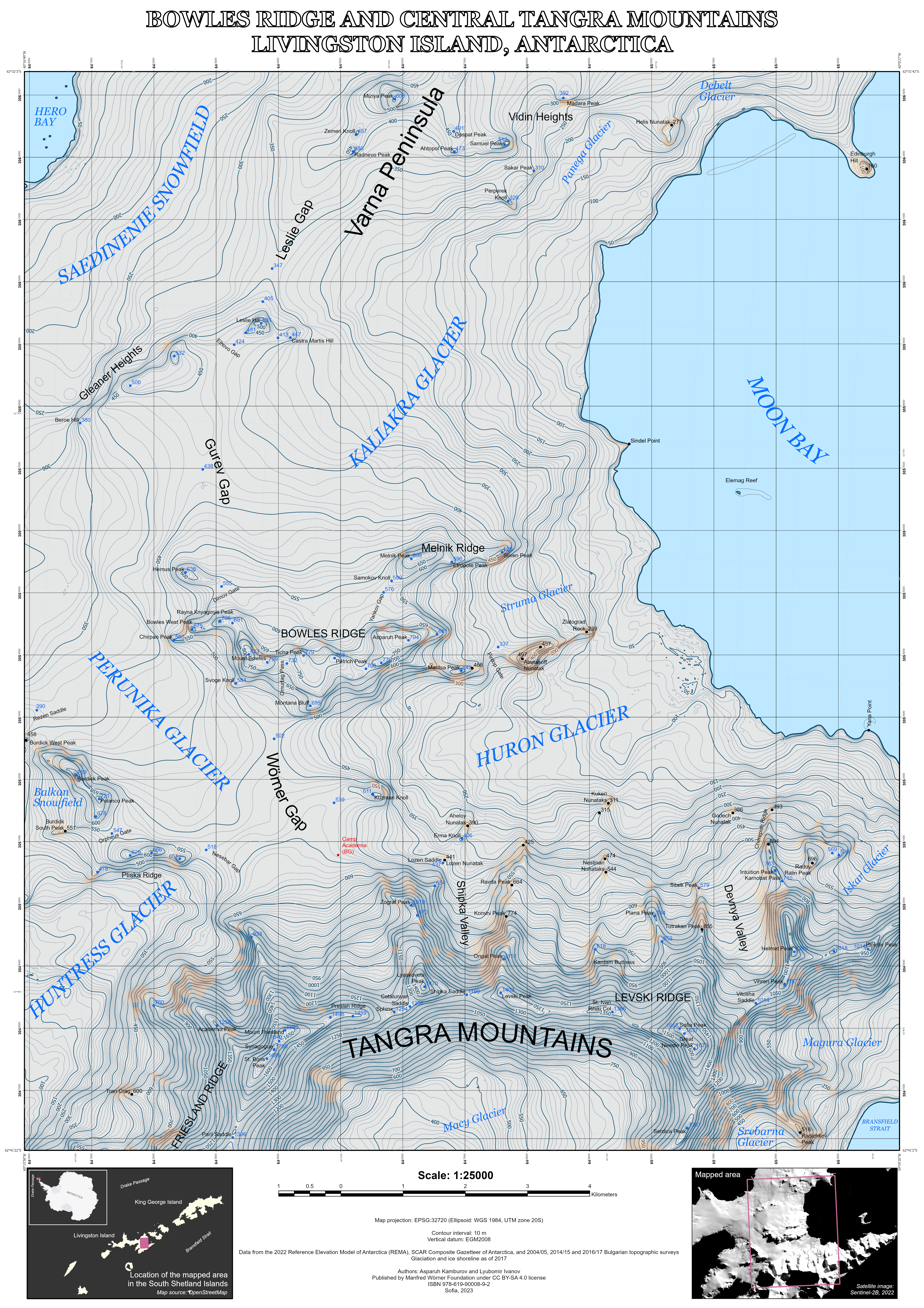
Topographic map of Bowles Ridge and Central Tangra Mountains featuring St. Boris Peak

== Notes ==
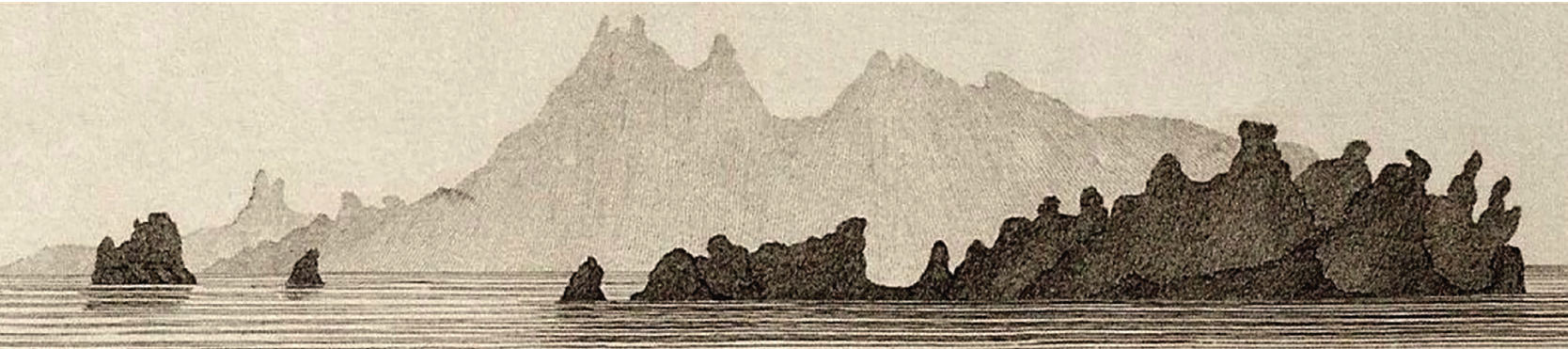
North view of Tangra Mountains depicting (left to right) Great Needle Peak, Levski Peak, Lyaskovets Peak, Mount Friesland, St. Boris Peak and Simeon Peak, with Desolation Island in the foreground; fragment of an illustration to George Powell's 1822 chart of the South Shetland and South Orkney Islands
