= Catalunyan Saddle =

Location of Tangra Mountains on Livingston Island in the South Shetland Islands

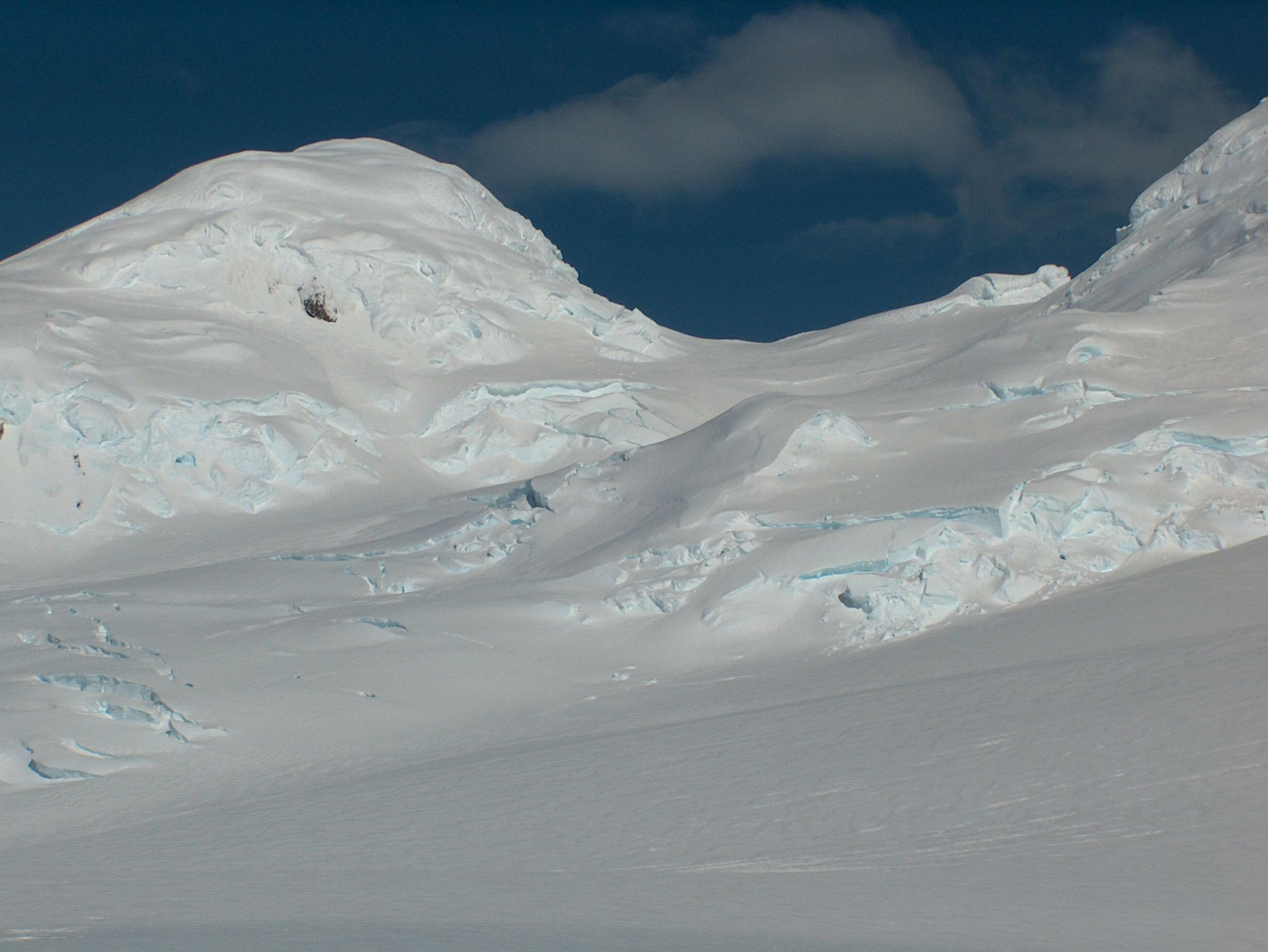
Catalunyan Saddle from Wörner Gap

Topographic map of Livingston Island and Smith Island

Catalunyan Saddle (Katalunska Sedlovina \ka-ta-'lun-ska se-dlo-vi-'na\) is a saddle of 1260 m height in the Friesland Ridge of the Tangra Mountains on Livingston Island, in the South Shetland Islands. The saddle is bounded by Lyaskovets Peak to the east and by Presian Ridge to the west. The saddle was named in honour of the Catalans Francesc Sàbat (q.v. Sàbat Hill) and Jorge Enrique (q.v. Enrique Hill) from Juan Carlos I Base who established the first route via the saddle to Mount Friesland on 30 December 1991.

== Location ==
The saddle is located at 62°39′58.5″S 60°08′51.2″W which is 11.5 km east of St. Kliment Ohridski Base and 3.4 km south of Kuzman Knoll. Part of the saddle is occupied by an amazingly shaped ice-covered feature called the Sphinx.

The saddle was occupied by a bivouac of the Bulgarian Tangra 2004/05 Survey team (Lyubomir Ivanov and Doychin Vasilev) during 14 December–16 December 2004 and was mapped in 2005.

== Maps ==
- L.L. Ivanov et al. Antarctica: Livingston Island and Greenwich Island, South Shetland Islands. Scale 1:100000 topographic map. Sofia: Antarctic Place-names Commission of Bulgaria, 2005.
- L.L. Ivanov. Antarctica: Livingston Island and Greenwich, Robert, Snow and Smith Islands. Scale 1:120000 topographic map. Troyan: Manfred Wörner Foundation, 2009. ISBN 978-954-92032-6-4
- L.L. Ivanov. Antarctica: Livingston Island and Smith Island. Scale 1:100000 topographic map. Manfred Wörner Foundation, 2017. ISBN 978-619-90008-3-0
- A. Kamburov and L. Ivanov. Bowles Ridge and Central Tangra Mountains: Livingston Island, Antarctica. Scale 1:25000 map. Sofia: Manfred Wörner Foundation, 2023. ISBN 978-619-90008-6-1

== Gallery ==
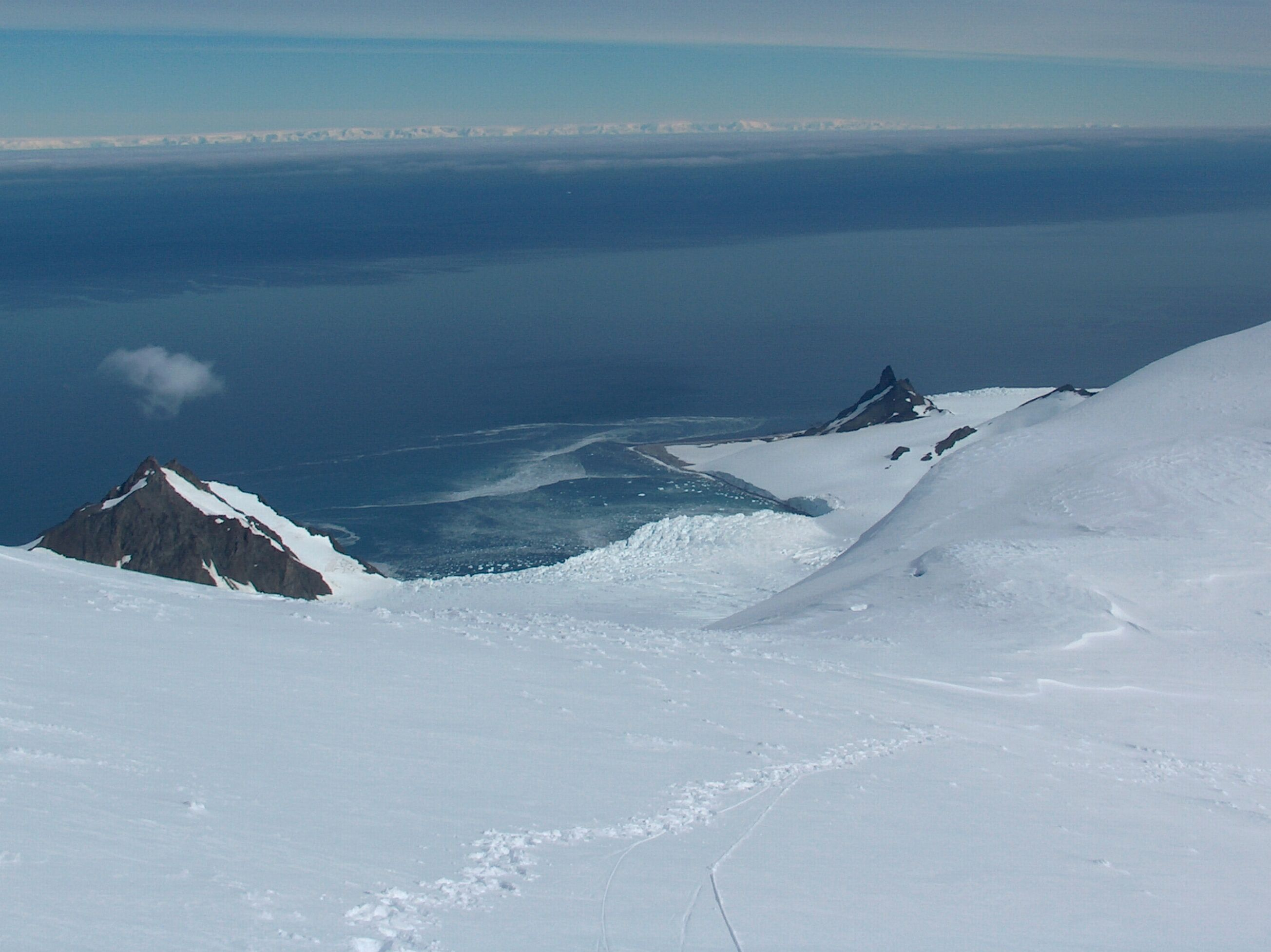
Catalunyan Saddle in the foreground, with Bransfield Strait in the foreground and the Antarctic Peninsula on the horizon

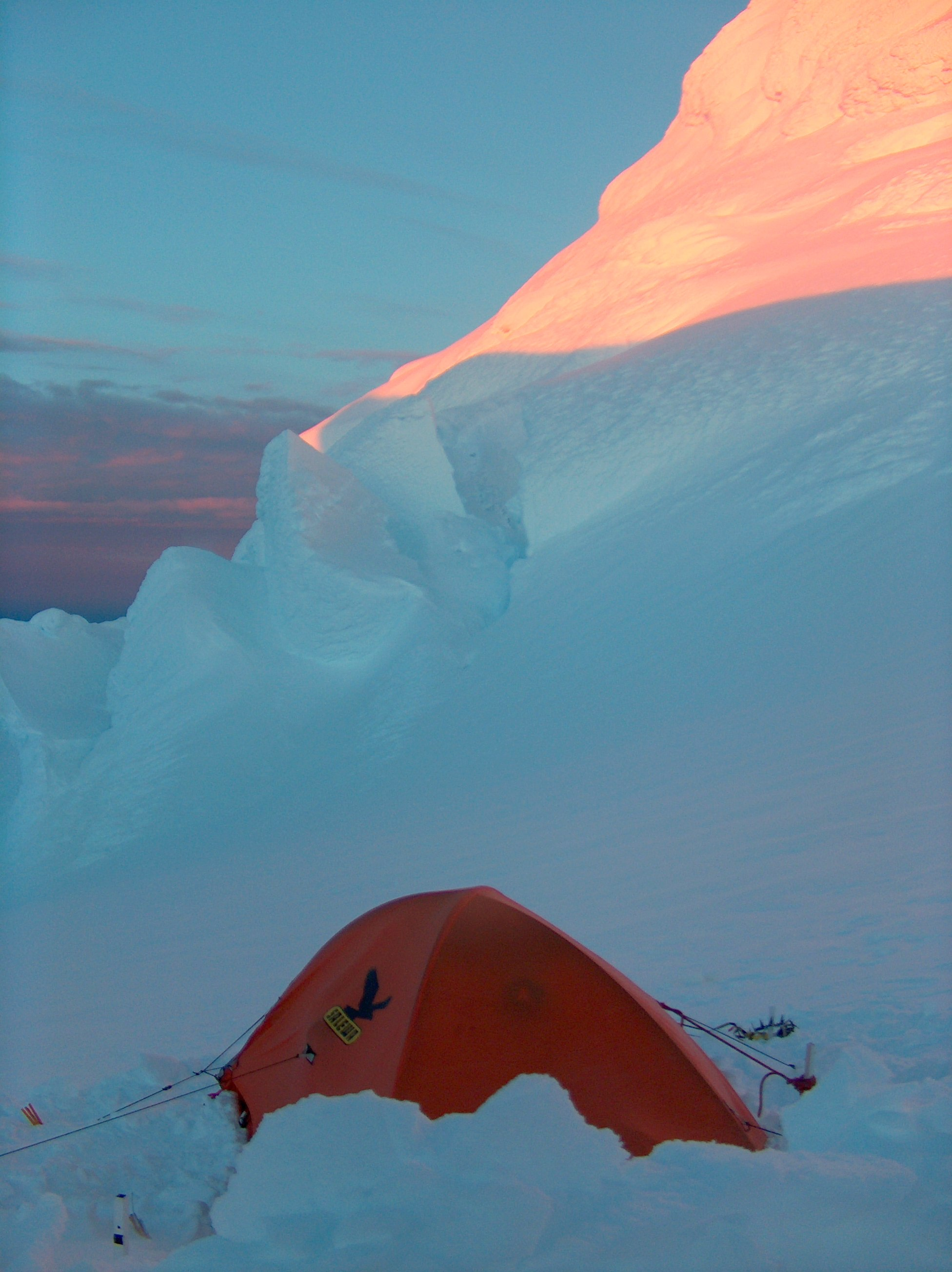
The Tangra 2004/05 Bivouac at Catalunyan Saddle

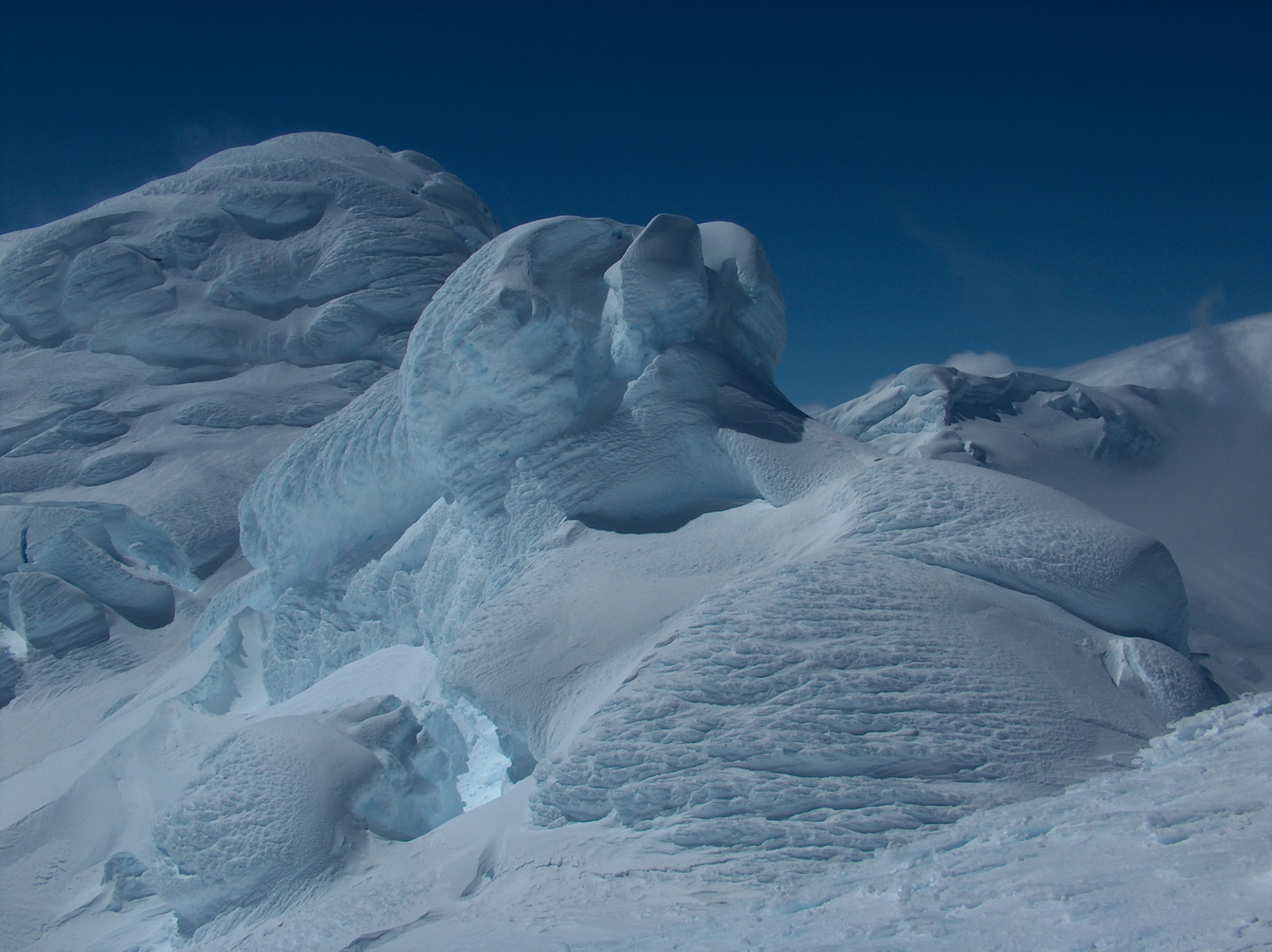
‘The Sphinx,’ with Lyaskovets Peak on the left and Levski Peak on the right background

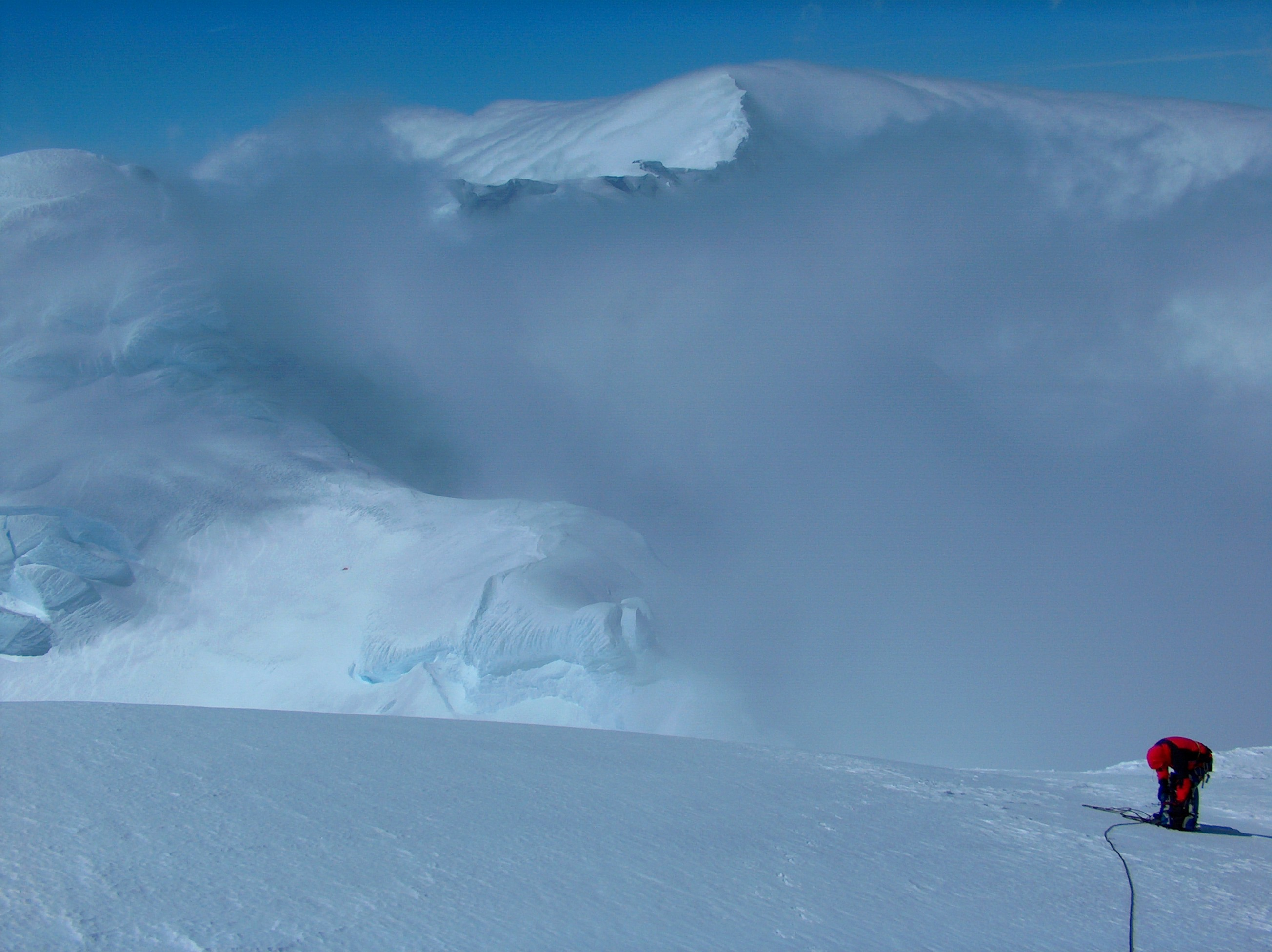
Catalunyan Saddle with 'The Sphinx' from Presian Ridge, with St. Ivan Rilski Col emerging from the fog in the background

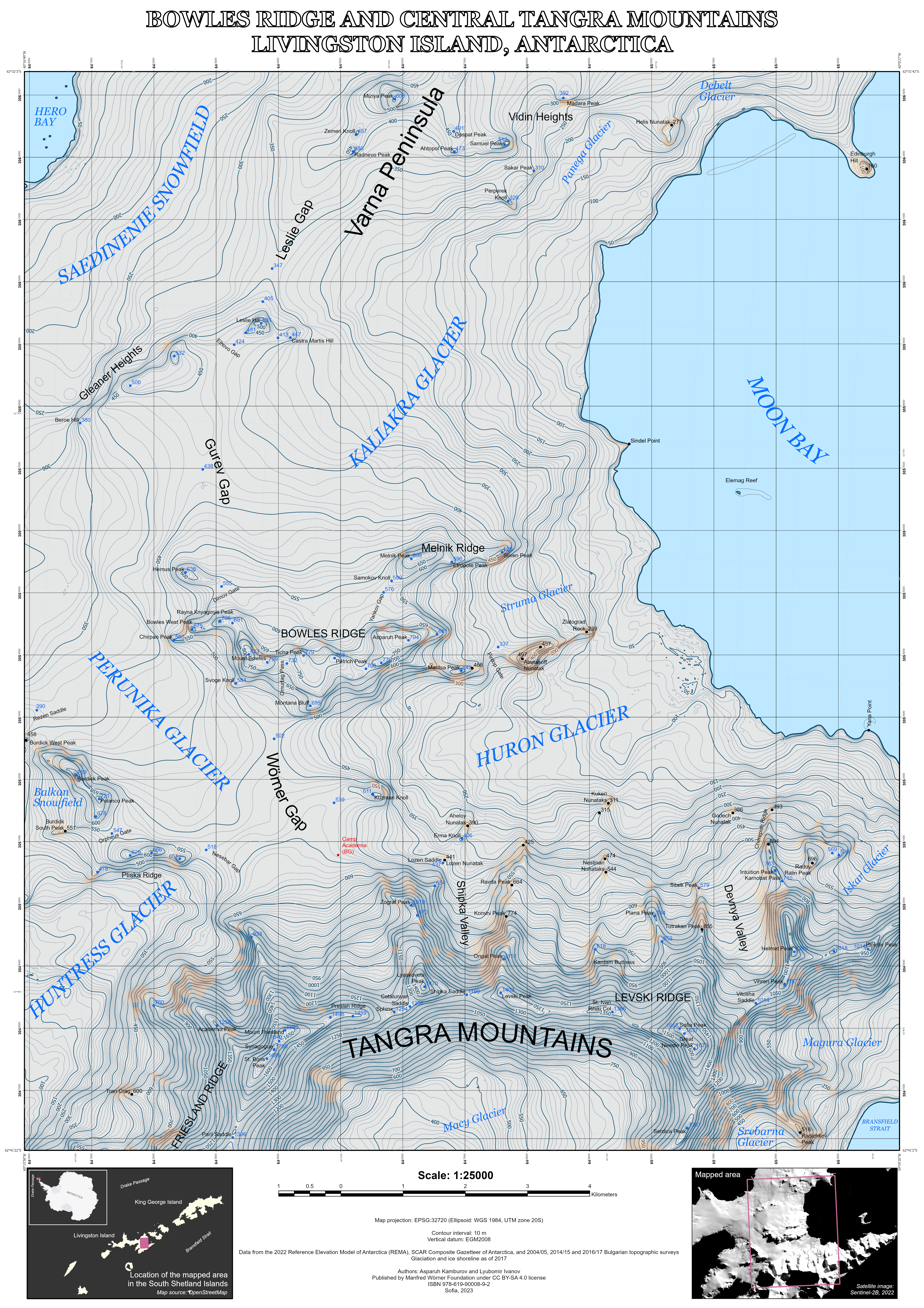
Topographic map of Bowles Ridge and central Tangra Mountains
