= Presian Ridge =

Ridge in Antarctica

Location of Tangra Mountains on Livingston Island in the South Shetland Islands.

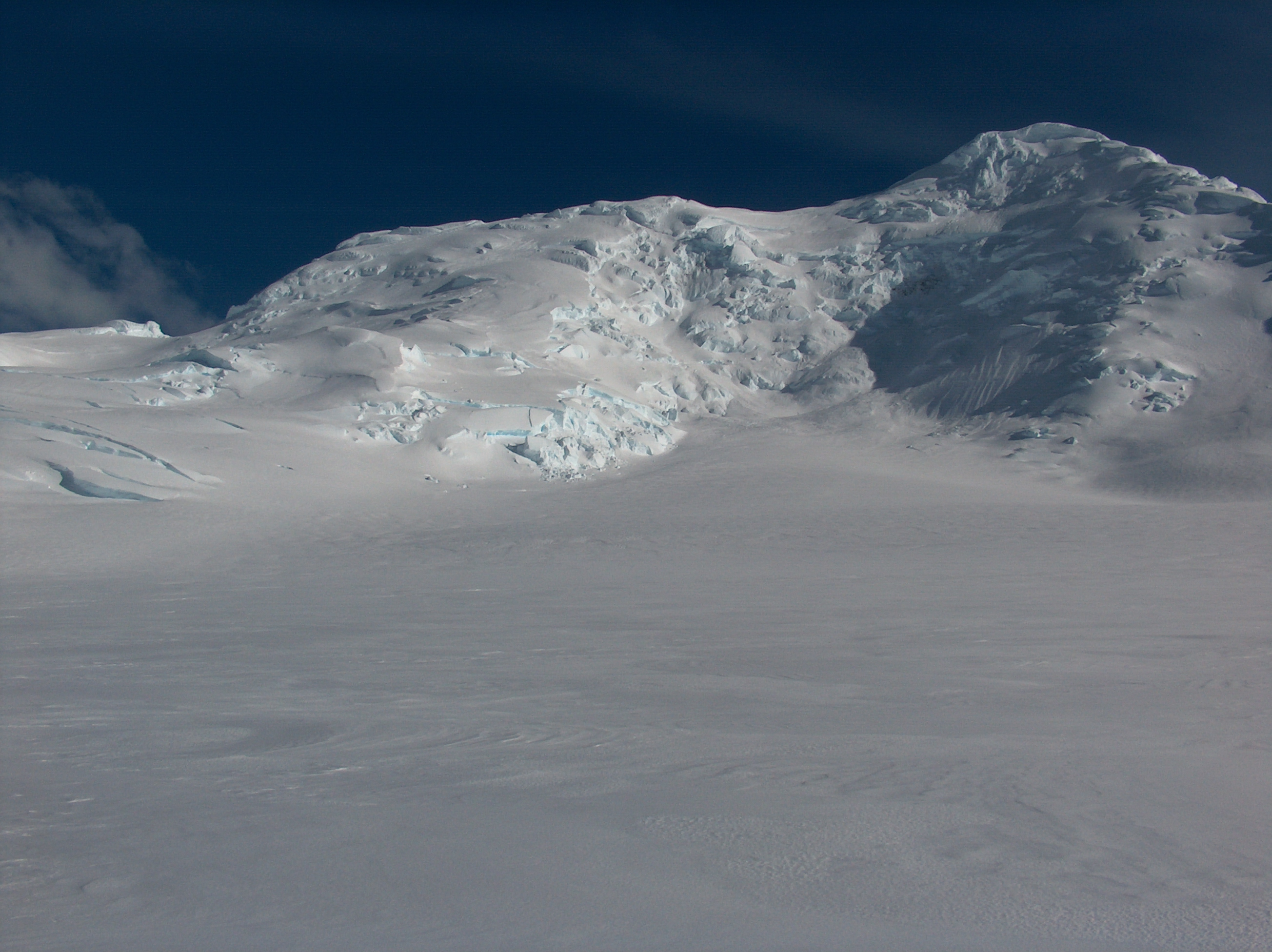
Presian Ridge (on the left) and Mount Friesland from Wörner Gap.

Presian Ridge (Presiyanov Rid \pre-si-'ya-nov 'rid\) is a ridge of elevation 1456 m extending 950 m in east-weat direction in Friesland Ridge, Tangra Mountains, Livingston Island in the South Shetland Islands, Antarctica. Situated between the island's summit Mount Friesland (1700 m) to the west and Catalunyan Saddle to the east. Surmounting Wörner Gap, Camp Academia locality and upper Huron Glacier to the north, and Macy Glacier to the south.

First ascent by the Catalans Francesc Sàbat and Jorge Enrique from Juan Carlos I Base on 30 December 1991.

The ridge is named after Khan Presian of Bulgaria, 836-852 AD, who brought the Bulgarian lands in Macedonia together with those in Thrace, Moesia, Panonia, Dacia and Scythia.

== Location ==
The summit point of the ridge is located at 62°40′03.8″S 60°09′55.3″W, which is 1.11 km east of Mount Friesland, 4.14 km southeast of Pliska Peak, 3.54 km south by west of Kuzman Knoll, 1.24 km west-southwest of Lyaskovets Peak and 4.08 km north-northwest of Peshev Peak (Bulgarian topographic survey Tangra 2004/05, and mapping in 2005 and 2009).

== Maps ==
- South Shetland Islands. Scale 1:200000 topographic map. DOS 610 Sheet W 62 60. Tolworth, UK, 1968.
- Islas Livingston y Decepción. Mapa topográfico a escala 1:100000. Madrid: Servicio Geográfico del Ejército, 1991.
- S. Soccol, D. Gildea and J. Bath. Livingston Island, Antarctica. Scale 1:100000 satellite map. The Omega Foundation, USA, 2004.
- L.L. Ivanov et al., Antarctica: Livingston Island and Greenwich Island, South Shetland Islands (from English Strait to Morton Strait, with illustrations and ice-cover distribution), 1:100000 scale topographic map, Antarctic Place-names Commission of Bulgaria, Sofia, 2005
- L.L. Ivanov. Antarctica: Livingston Island and Greenwich, Robert, Snow and Smith Islands. Scale 1:120000 topographic map. Troyan: Manfred Wörner Foundation, 2010. ISBN 978-954-92032-9-5 (First edition 2009. ISBN 978-954-92032-6-4)
- Antarctic Digital Database (ADD). Scale 1:250000 topographic map of Antarctica. Scientific Committee on Antarctic Research (SCAR), 1993–2016.
- L.L. Ivanov. Antarctica: Livingston Island and Smith Island. Scale 1:100000 topographic map. Manfred Wörner Foundation, 2017. ISBN 978-619-90008-3-0
- A. Kamburov and L. Ivanov. Bowles Ridge and Central Tangra Mountains: Livingston Island, Antarctica. Scale 1:25000 map. Sofia: Manfred Wörner Foundation, 2023. ISBN 978-619-90008-6-1

== Gallery ==
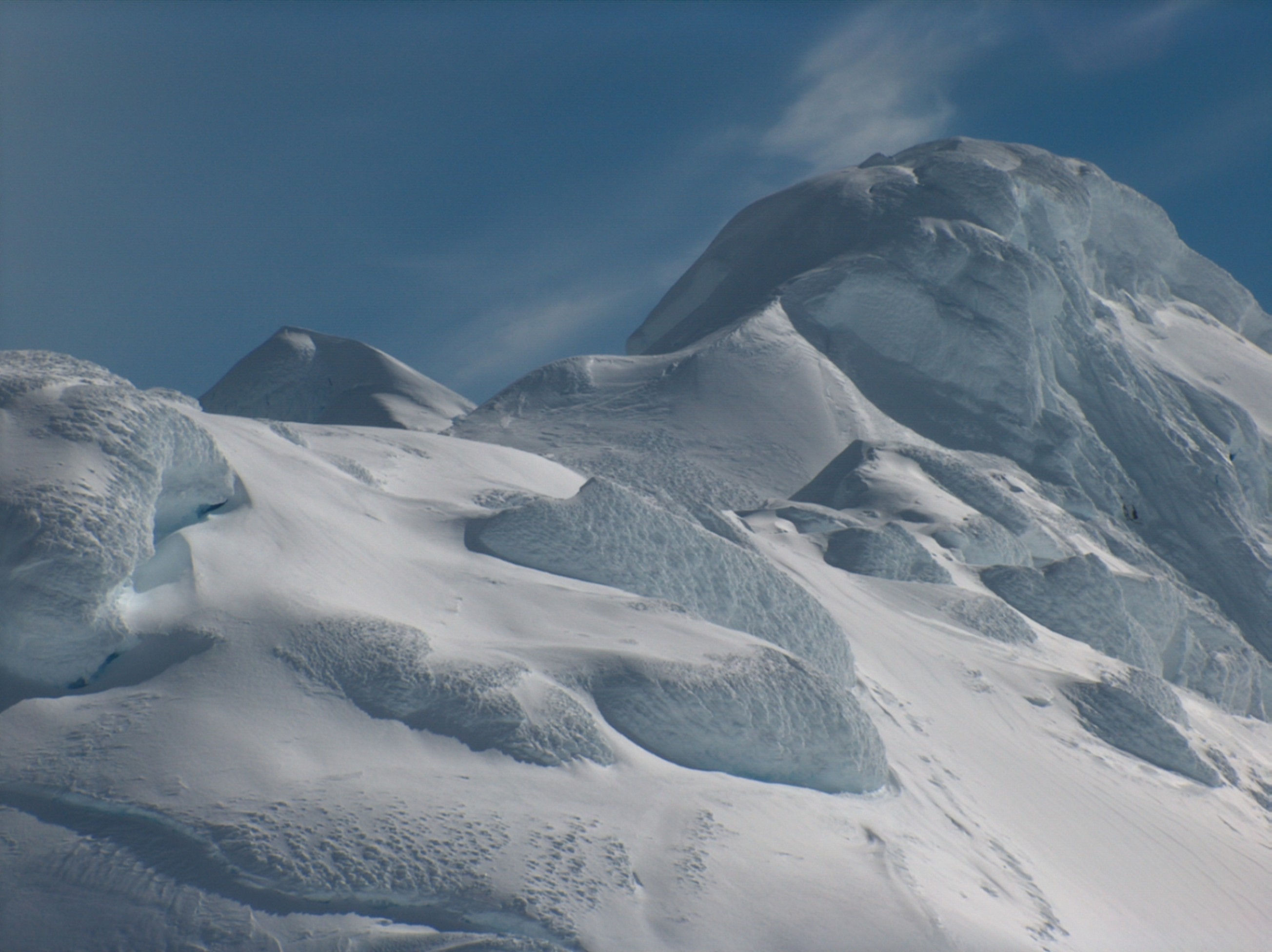
Presian Ridge from the west slope of Lyaskovets Peak, with Mount Friesland in the background.

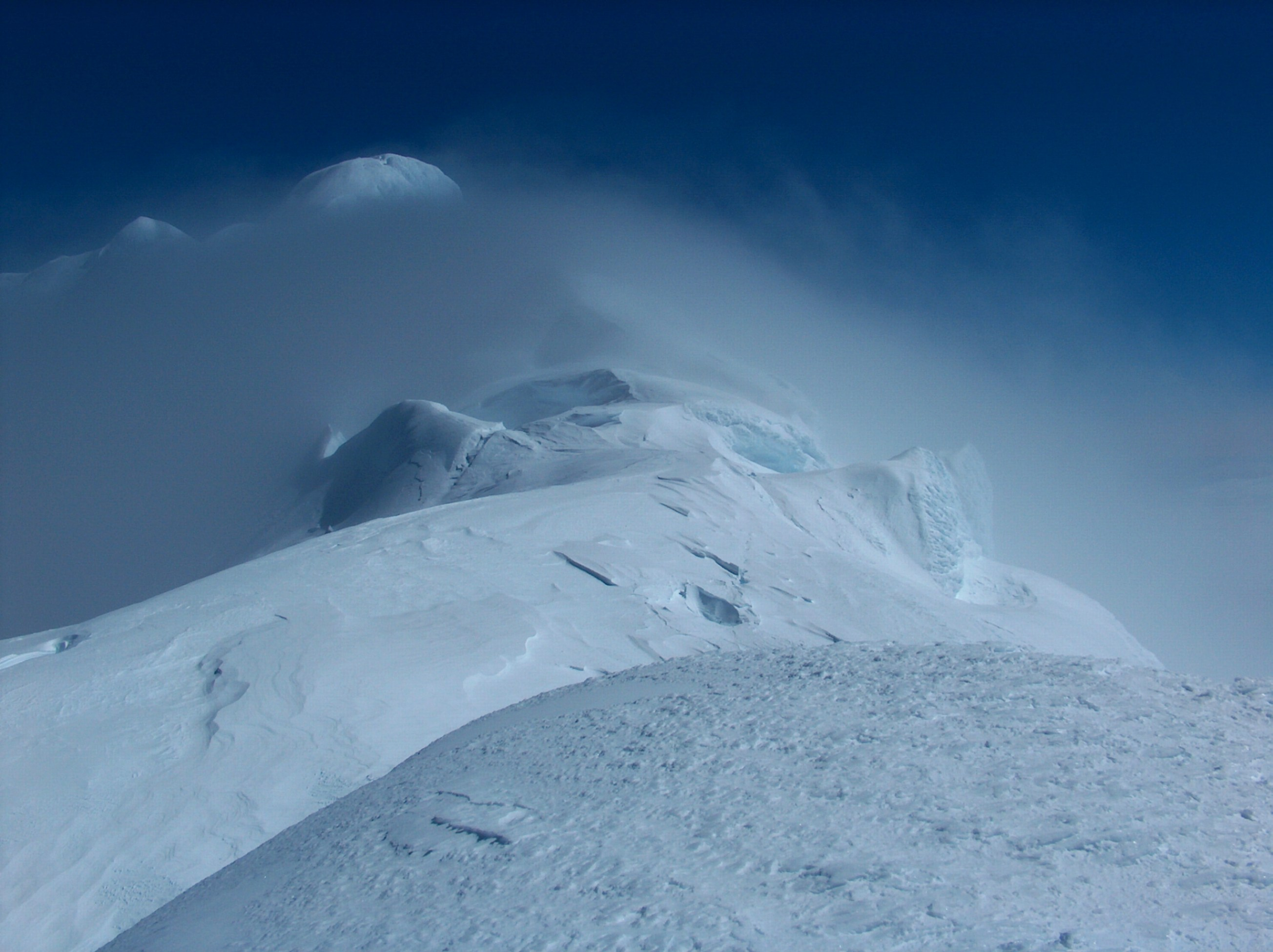
Presian Ridge from Lyaskovets Peak and, in the background, Mount Friesland with ‘The Synagogue’ on the left.

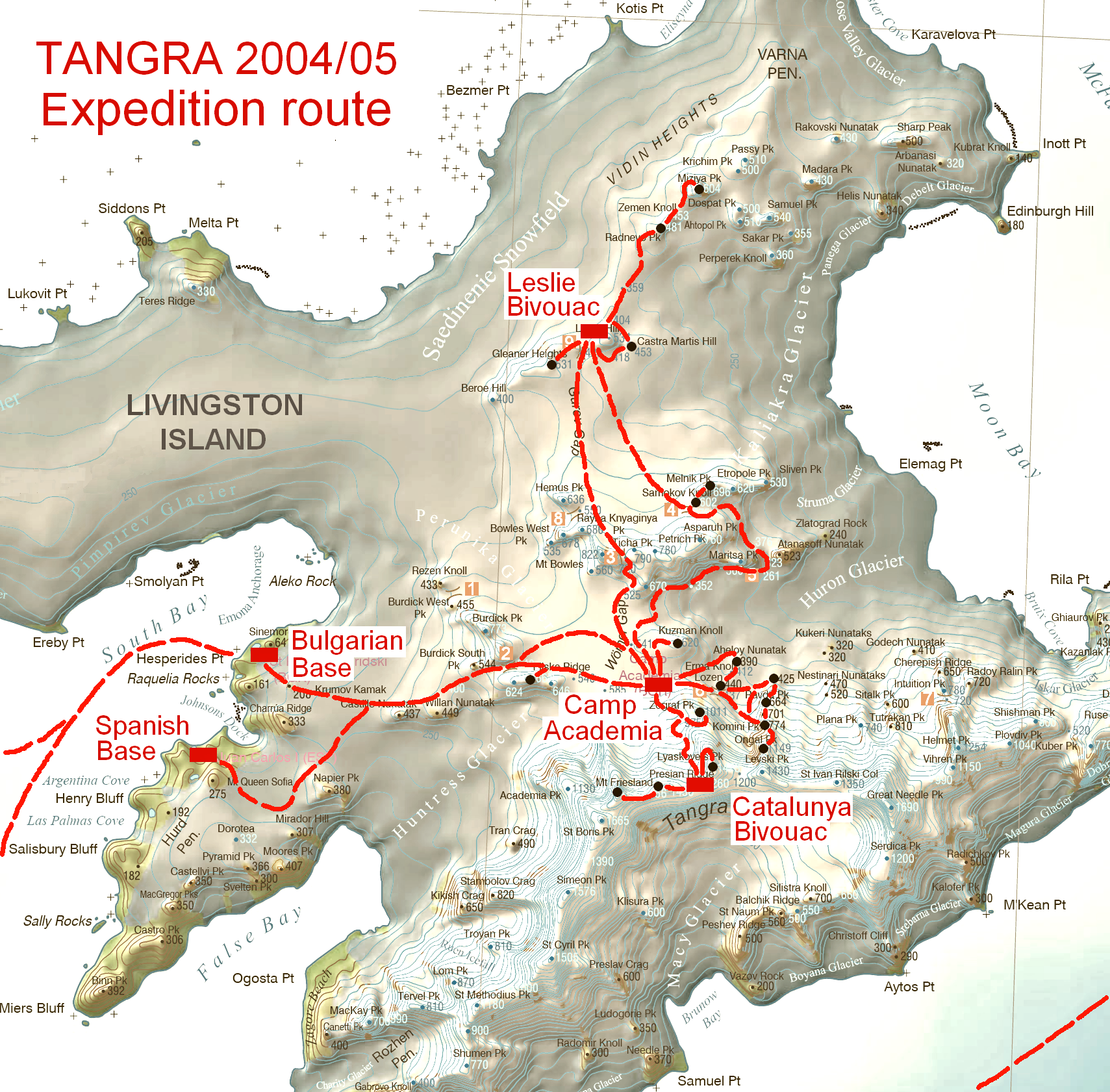
The survey route of Tangra 2004/05 including Presian Ridge.

Topographic map of Livingston Island and Smith Island.
