= Polanco Peak =

721m peak in the South Shetland Islands, Antarctica

Location of Livingston Island in the South Shetland Islands

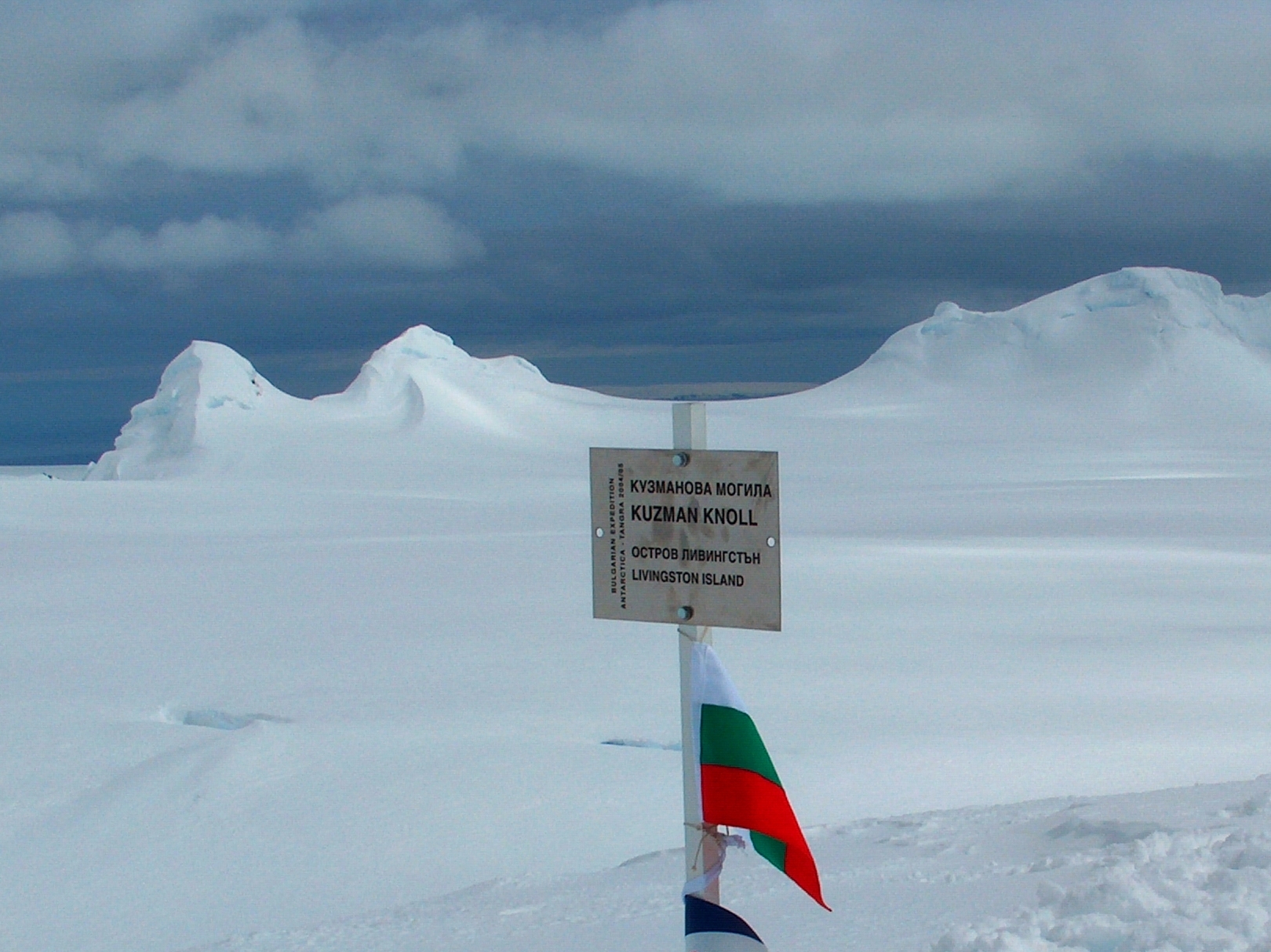
Polanco Peak, Orpheus Gate and Pliska Ridge (right to left) from Kuzman Knoll, with Wörner Gap in the foreground

Topographic map of Livingston Island and Smith Island

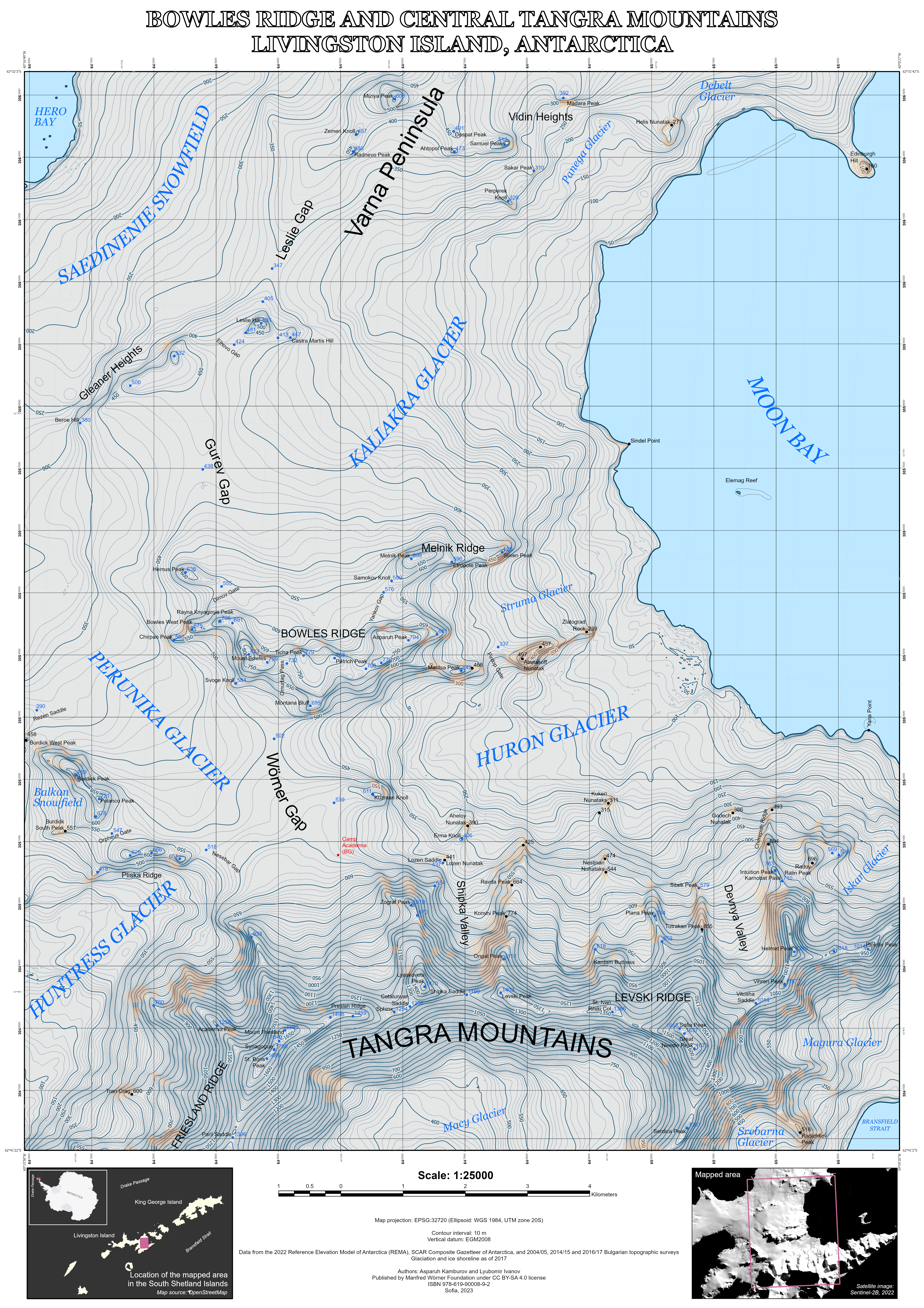
Topographic map of eastern Livingston Island featuring Polanco Peak

Polanco Peak (Bulgarian: връх Поланко, romanized: vrah Polanco, IPA: [ˈvrɤx po-ˈlan-ko]) is the ice-covered peak rising to 721 m on the northwest side of the pass Orpheus Gate on eastern Livingston Island in the South Shetland Islands, Antarctica. It surmounts Perunika Glacier on the north-east, Huntress Glacier on the south, and Balkan Snowfield on the west. First ascent by a team from the Spanish base Juan Carlos I led by Àlex Simón i Casanovas on 20 November 2003.

The feature is named after the Spanish diplomat Alejandro Polanco Mata for his particularly significant contribution to the development of Bulgarian-Spanish logistics and scientific collaboration in Antarctica.

== Location ==
The peak is located at 62°38′18.3″S 60°14′50.4″W, which is 525 m southeast of Burdick Peak, 3.125 km southwest of Bowles West Peak, 1.2 km northwest of the central summit of Pliska Ridge, and 750 m northeast of Burdick South Peak. British mapping in 1968, detailed Spanish mapping in 1991, and Bulgarian mapping in 1996, 2005, 2009 and 2023 from topographic surveys in 1995/96 and 2004/05), and data from the 2022 Reference Elevation Model of Antarctica (REMA).

== Maps ==
- Isla Livingston: Península Hurd. Mapa topográfico de escala 1:25000. Madrid: Servicio Geográfico del Ejército, 1991. (Map reproduced on p. 16 of the linked work)
- L.L. Ivanov. Livingston Island: Central-Eastern Region. Scale 1:25000 topographic map. Sofia: Antarctic Place-names Commission of Bulgaria, 1996.
- L.L. Ivanov et al. Antarctica: Livingston Island and Greenwich Island, South Shetland Islands. Scale 1:100000 topographic map. Sofia: Antarctic Place-names Commission of Bulgaria, 2005.
- L.L. Ivanov. Antarctica: Livingston Island and Greenwich, Robert, Snow and Smith Islands. Scale 1:120000 topographic map. Troyan: Manfred Wörner Foundation, 2009. ISBN 978-954-92032-6-4
- Antarctic Digital Database (ADD). Scale 1:250000 topographic map of Antarctica. Scientific Committee on Antarctic Research (SCAR). Since 1993, regularly upgraded and updated.
- L.L. Ivanov. Antarctica: Livingston Island and Smith Island. Scale 1:100000 topographic map. Manfred Wörner Foundation, 2017. ISBN 978-619-90008-3-0
- A. Kamburov and L. Ivanov. Bowles Ridge and Central Tangra Mountains: Livingston Island, Antarctica. Scale 1:25000 map. Sofia: Manfred Wörner Foundation, 2023. ISBN 978-619-90008-6-1
