= Tran Crag =

Crag in the South Shetland Islands, Antarctica

Location of Tangra Mountains on Livingston Island in the South Shetland Islands.

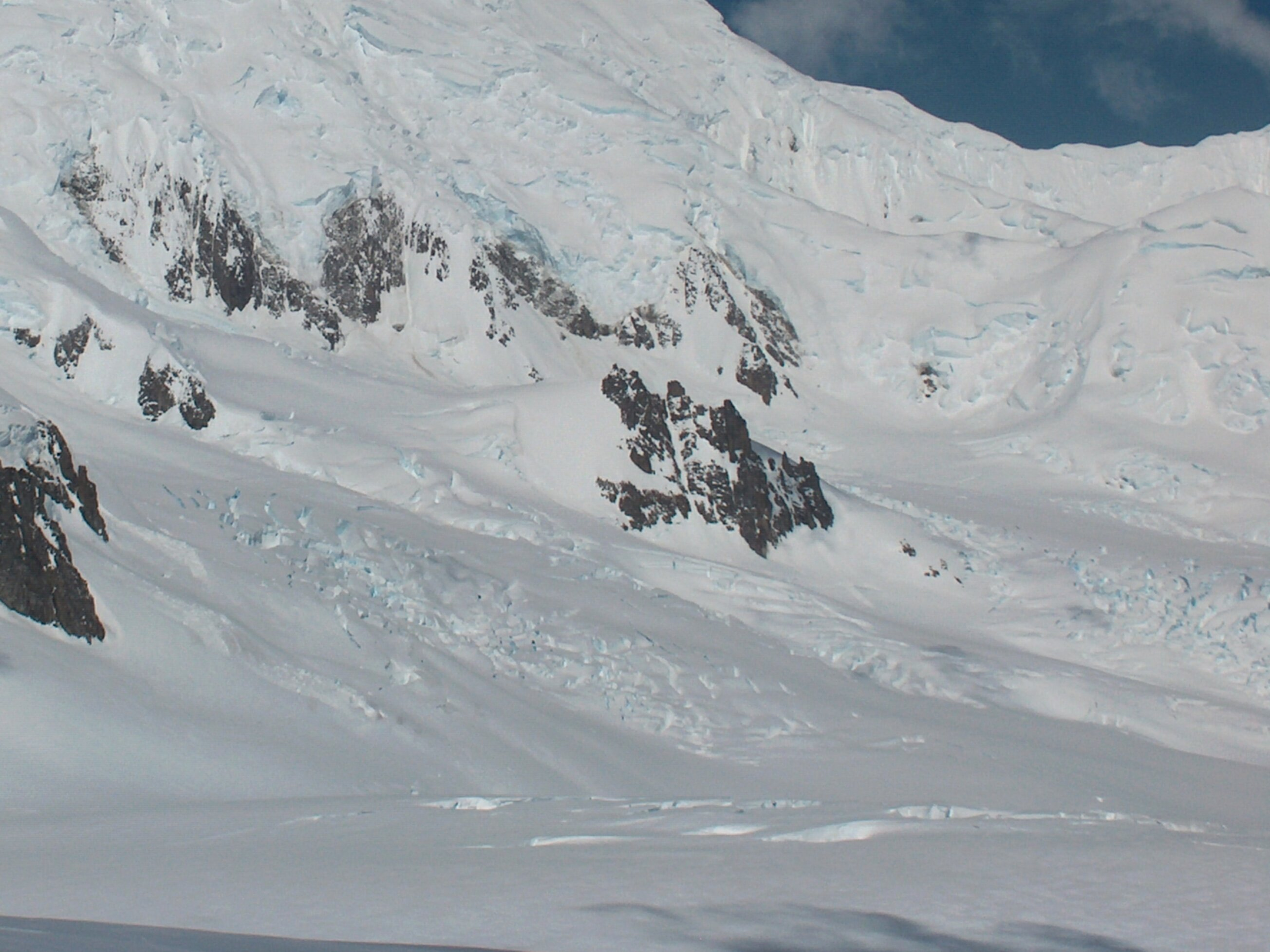
Tran Crag from Willan Saddle, with Huntress Glacier in the foreground.

Topographic map of Livingston Island and Smith Island

Tran Crag (Transki Kamak \'tr&n-ski 'ka-m&k\) rises to 490 m in the Tangra Mountains of Livingston Island in the South Shetland Islands, Antarctica and projects from the tributary glacier draining the west slopes of Friesland Ridge between St. Boris Peak and Simeon Peak. It is named after the town of Tran in Western Bulgaria.

== Location ==
The crag is located at 62°40′47.8″S 60°14′03″W, which is 1.94 km west-southwest of St. Boris Peak, 1.39 km north-northeast of Stambolov Crag and 3.7 km southeast of Willan Nunatak.

== Maps ==
- L.L. Ivanov et al. Antarctica: Livingston Island and Greenwich Island, South Shetland Islands. Scale 1:100000 topographic map. Sofia: Antarctic Place-names Commission of Bulgaria, 2005.
- L.L. Ivanov. Antarctica: Livingston Island and Greenwich, Robert, Snow and Smith Islands. Scale 1:120000 topographic map. Troyan: Manfred Wörner Foundation, 2010. ISBN 978-954-92032-9-5 (First edition 2009. ISBN 978-954-92032-6-4)
- Antarctic Digital Database (ADD). Scale 1:250000 topographic map of Antarctica. Scientific Committee on Antarctic Research (SCAR). Since 1993, regularly updated.
- L.L. Ivanov. Antarctica: Livingston Island and Smith Island. Scale 1:100000 topographic map. Manfred Wörner Foundation, 2017. ISBN 978-619-90008-3-0
- A. Kamburov and L. Ivanov. Bowles Ridge and Central Tangra Mountains: Livingston Island, Antarctica. Scale 1:25000 map. Sofia: Manfred Wörner Foundation, 2023. ISBN 978-619-90008-6-1
