= Academia Peak =

Peak in Antarctica (1,253m)

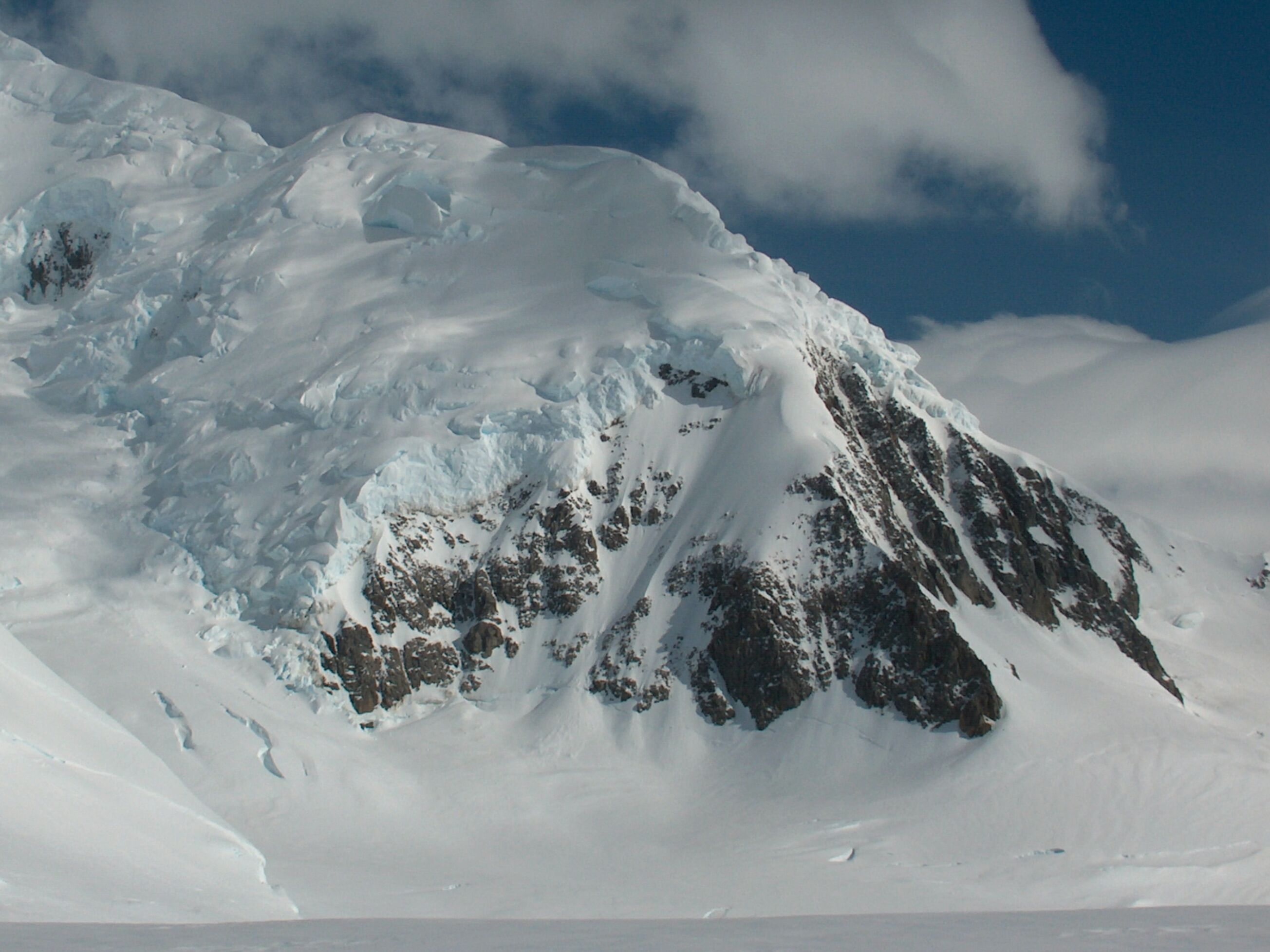

Highest point
- Elevation: 1,253 m (4,111 ft)
- Coordinates: 62°40′13″S 60°12′30″W

Geography
- Location within Antarctica
- Location: Livingston Island, Antarctica
- Parent range: Tangra Mountains

Climbing
- First ascent: 16 January 2017 Doychin Boyanov, Nikolay Petkov and Nedelcho Hazarbasanov

Academia Peak (Bulgarian: връх Академия, romanized: vrah Akademiya, IPA: [ˈvrɤx ɐkɐˈdɛmijɐ]) is a peak rising to 1,253 m in the Friesland Ridge, Tangra Mountains on eastern Livingston Island in Antarctica. The peak has precipitous and ice-free north-western slopes and surmounts Huntress Glacier to the northwest and southwest. It was first ascended and GPS-surveyed by the Bulgarian climbers D. Boyanov, N. Petkov and N. Hazarbasanov from Nesebar Gap via the head of Huntress Glacier on 15 January 2017.

The peak is named for the Bulgarian Academy of Sciences (established 1869) for its important role in the Bulgarian Antarctic research.

== Location ==
The peak is located 1 km northwest of St. Boris Peak, 2.96 km south by southeast of the summit of Pliska Ridge and 3.9 km east by southeast of Willan Nunatak. The peak was first mapped by Bulgaria in 2005, and later in 2009.

== See also ==
- Bulgarian toponyms in Antarctica
- Antarctic Place-names Commission

== Maps ==
- L.L. Ivanov et al. Antarctica: Livingston Island and Greenwich Island, South Shetland Islands. Scale 1:100000 topographic map. Sofia: Antarctic Place-names Commission of Bulgaria, 2005.
- L.L. Ivanov. Antarctica: Livingston Island and Greenwich, Robert, Snow and Smith Islands. Scale 1:120000 topographic map. Troyan: Manfred Wörner Foundation, 2009.
- Antarctic Digital Database (ADD). Scale 1:250000 topographic map of Antarctica. Scientific Committee on Antarctic Research (SCAR). Since 1993, regularly upgraded and updated.
- L.L. Ivanov. Antarctica: Livingston Island and Smith Island. Scale 1:100000 topographic map. Manfred Wörner Foundation, 2017. ISBN 978-619-90008-3-0
- A. Kamburov and L. Ivanov. Bowles Ridge and Central Tangra Mountains: Livingston Island, Antarctica. Scale 1:25000 map. Sofia: Manfred Wörner Foundation, 2023. ISBN 978-619-90008-6-1

== Gallery ==
Topographic map of Livingston Island and Smith Island

Location of Tangra Mountains on Livingston Island in the South Shetland Islands

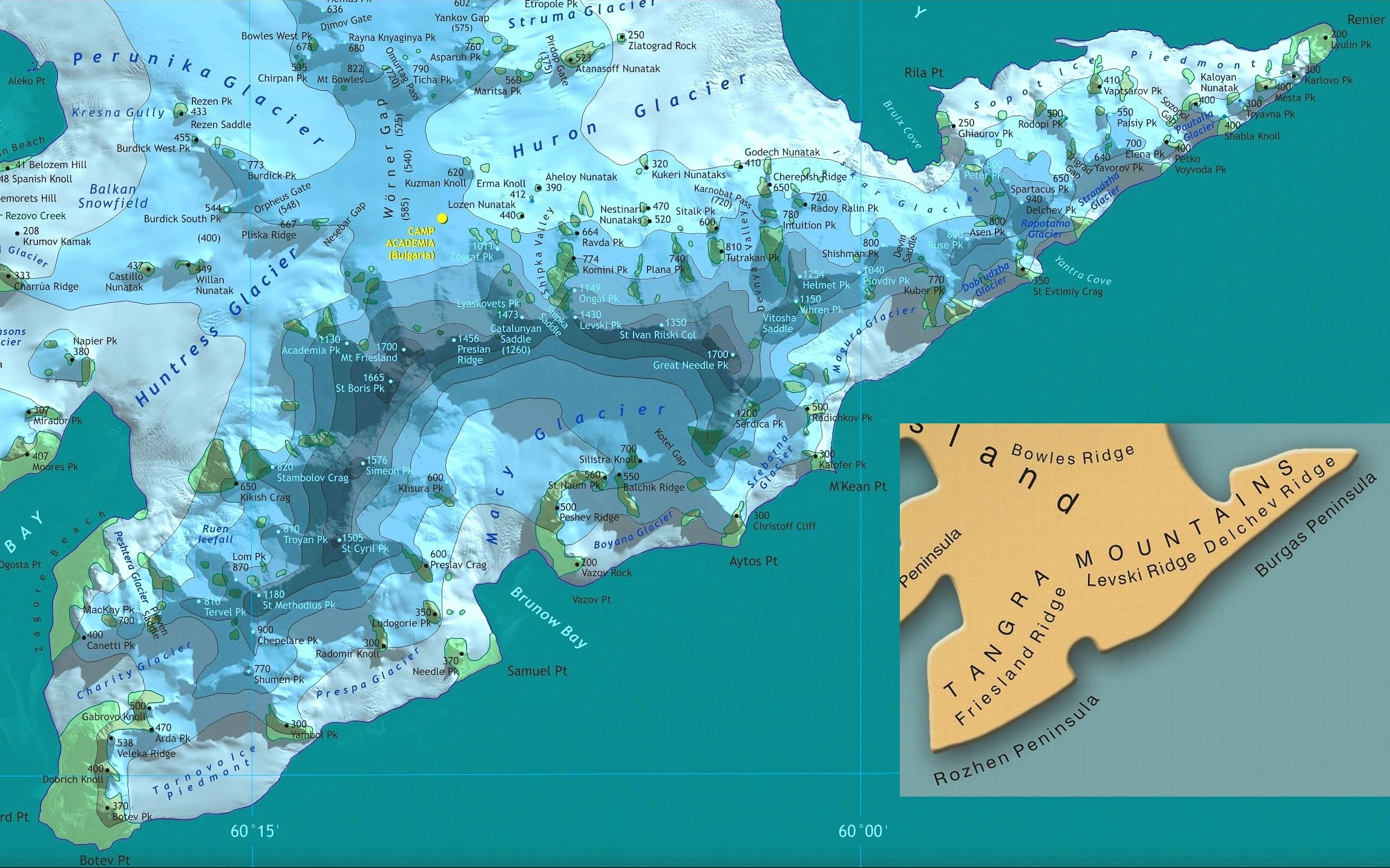
Map of Tangra Mountains

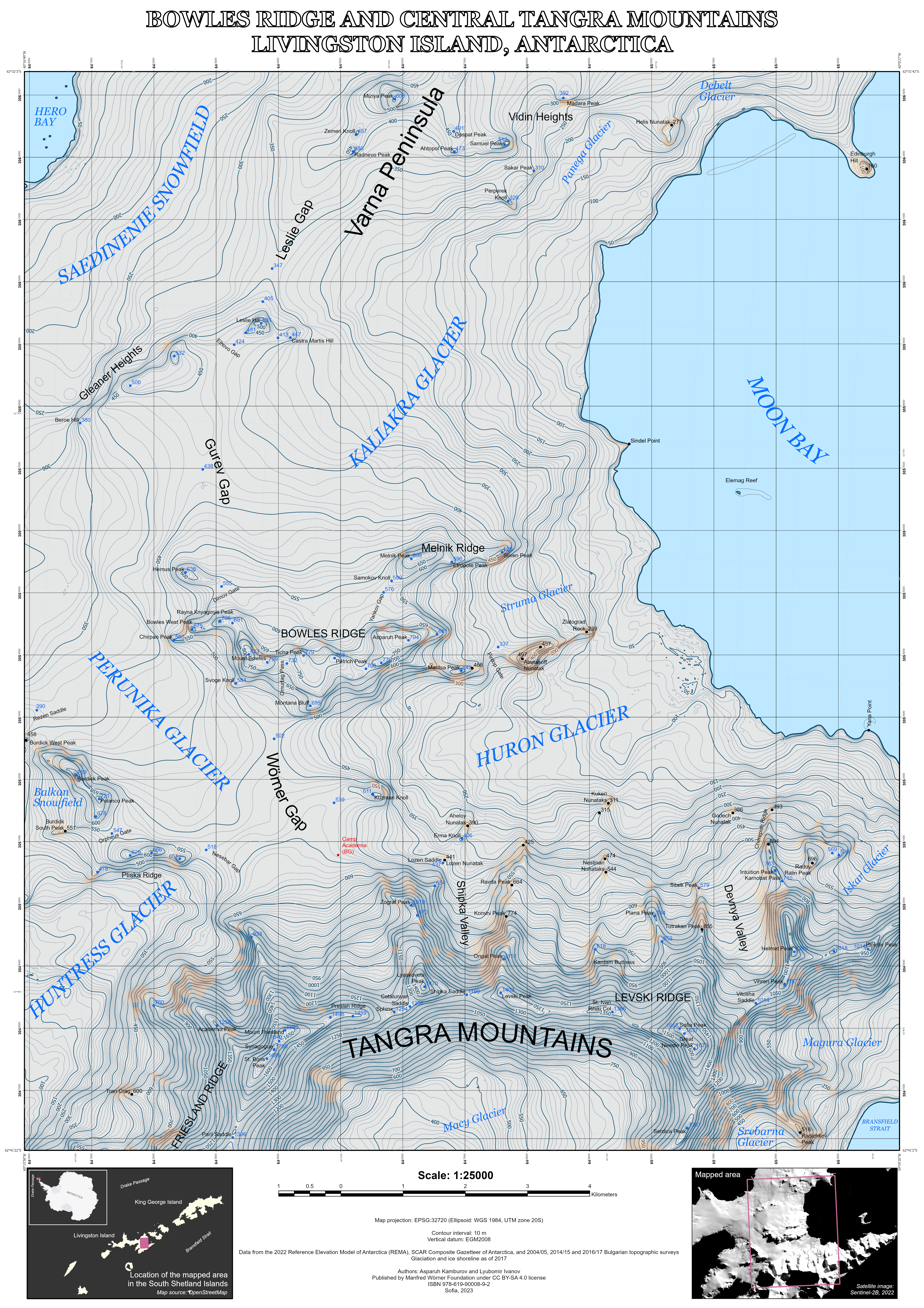
Topographic map of Bowles Ridge and central Tangra Mountains featuring Academia Peak
