= Burdick South Peak =

Peak in eastern Livingston Island

Location of Livingston Island in the South Shetland Islands.

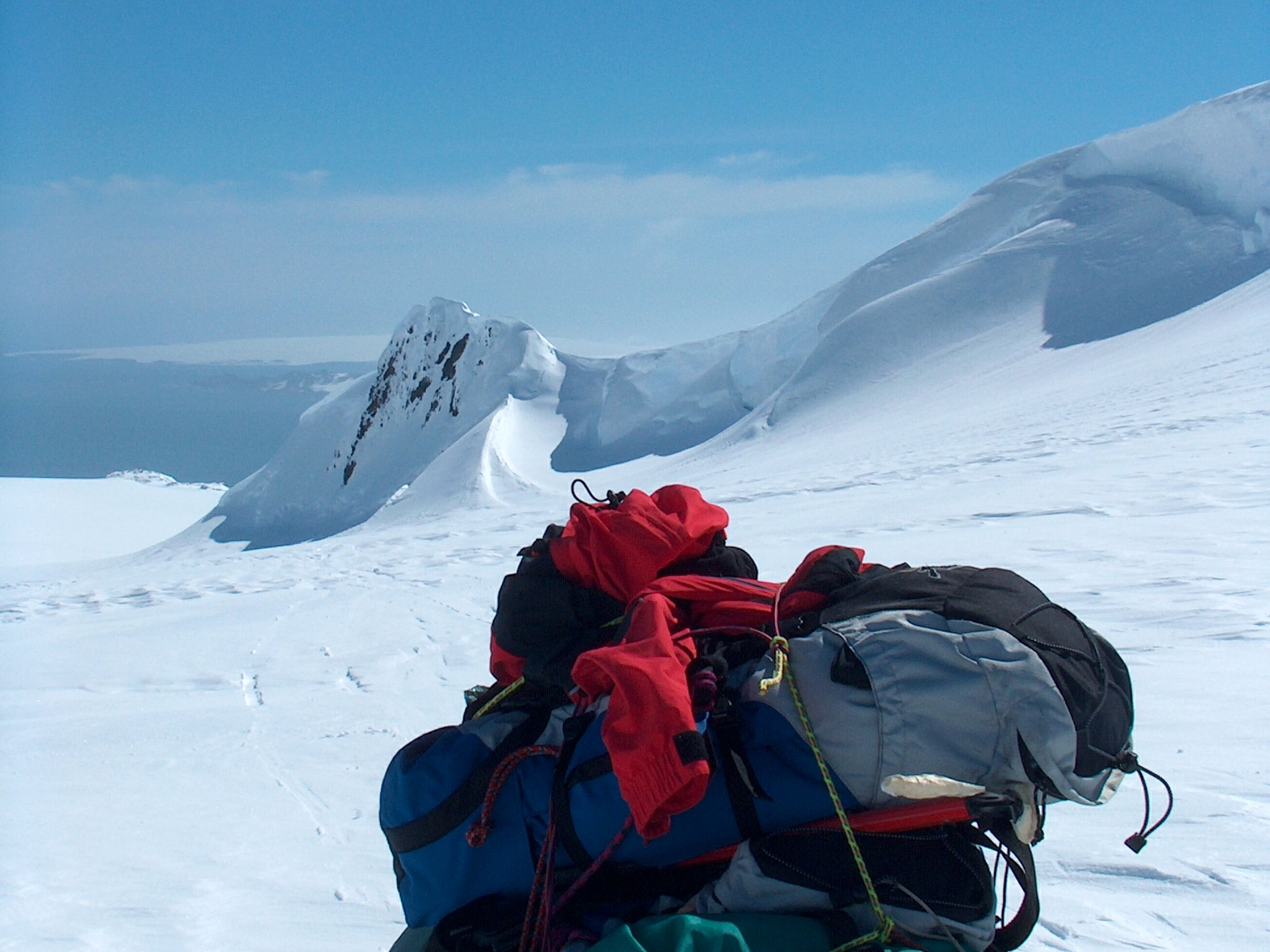
Burdick South Peak from Orpheus Gate.

Topographic map of Livingston Island, Greenwich, Robert, Snow and Smith Islands.

Burdick South Peak (Bulgarian: връх южен Бърдик, romanized: vrah yuzhen Bardik, IPA: [ˈvrɤx ˈjuʒɛn ˈbɤrdik]) rises 544 m and is formed by an offshoot extending 1 km west-southwestwards from the southeastern extremity of Burdick Ridge in eastern Livingston Island. The peak is narrow, with steep and partly ice-free southern and northern slopes. It is linked to Willan Nunatak by Willan Saddle.

The feature takes its name from Burdick Peak.

== Location ==
The peak is located at 62°38′36″S 60°15′33″W which is 980 m south by west of Burdick Peak, 5.26 km east of Sinemorets Hill, 1.45 km northeast of Willan Nunatak and 1.49 km west-northwest of Pliska Peak.

The peak was mapped by the Spanish Servicio Geográfico del Ejército in 1991. Co-ordinates, elevation and distances given according to a 1995-96 Bulgarian topographic survey.

== Maps ==
- L.L. Ivanov et al. Antarctica: Livingston Island and Greenwich Island, South Shetland Islands. Scale 1:100000 topographic map. Sofia: Antarctic Place-names Commission of Bulgaria, 2005.
- L.L. Ivanov. Antarctica: Livingston Island and Greenwich, Robert, Snow and Smith Islands. Scale 1:120000 topographic map. Troyan: Manfred Wörner Foundation, 2009.
- A. Kamburov and L. Ivanov. Bowles Ridge and Central Tangra Mountains: Livingston Island, Antarctica. Scale 1:25000 map. Sofia: Manfred Wörner Foundation, 2023. ISBN 978-619-90008-6-1
