= Stambolov Crag =

Crag in the South Shetland Islands, Antarctica

Location of Tangra Mountains on Livingston Island in the South Shetland Islands.

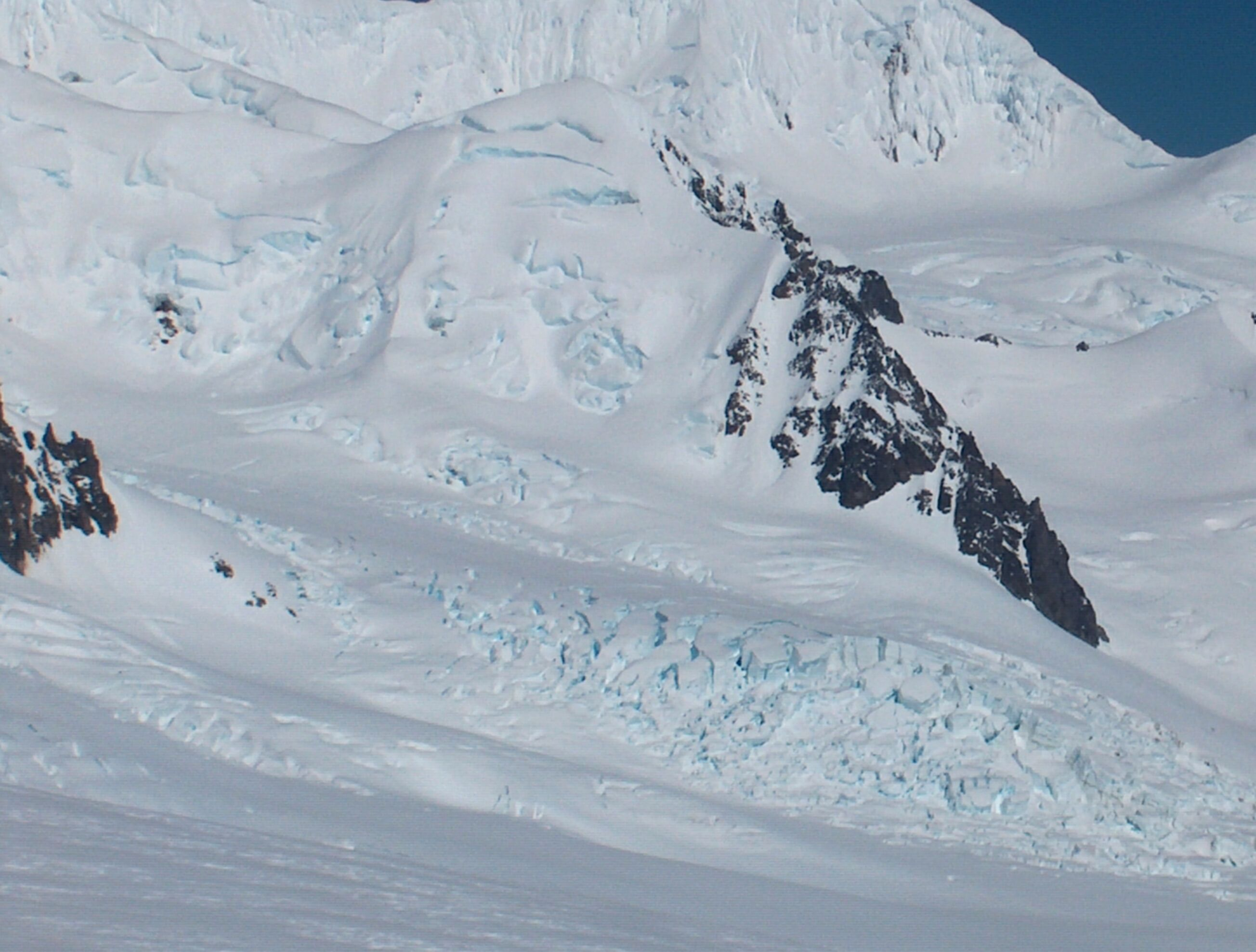
Stambolov Crag from Willan Saddle.

Topographic map of Livingston Island, Greenwich, Robert, Snow and Smith Islands.

Stambolov Crag (Bulgarian: връх Стамболов, romanized: vrah Stambolov, IPA: [ˈvrɤx stɐmboˈɫɔf]) rises to 820m in Friesland Ridge, Tangra Mountains, Livingston Island in the South Shetland Islands, Antarctica with steep, snow-free western slopes. The crag surmounts Huntress Glacier to the northwest and its tributary to the north, and Ruen Icefall to the southwest.

The feature is named after Stefan Stambolov (1854–1895), prominent Bulgarian statesman.

== Location ==
The crag is located at 62°41′32.4″S 60°14′28″W, which is 1.77 km west of Simeon Peak, 2 km northwest of St. Cyril Peak, 2.63 km north of St. Methodius Peak, 1.2 km north of Troyan Peak, 850 m east-northeast of Kikish Crag, 4.87 km southeast of Napier Peak, 4.63 km south-southeast of Willan Nunatak and 1.39 km south-southwest of Tran Crag (Bulgarian mapping in 2005 and 2009).

== Maps ==
- South Shetland Islands. Scale 1:200000 topographic map. DOS 610 Sheet W 62 60. Tolworth, UK, 1968.
- Islas Livingston y Decepción. Mapa topográfico a escala 1:100000. Madrid: Servicio Geográfico del Ejército, 1991.
- S. Soccol, D. Gildea and J. Bath. Livingston Island, Antarctica. Scale 1:100000 satellite map. The Omega Foundation, USA, 2004.
- L.L. Ivanov et al., Antarctica: Livingston Island and Greenwich Island, South Shetland Islands (from English Strait to Morton Strait, with illustrations and ice-cover distribution), 1:100000 scale topographic map, Antarctic Place-names Commission of Bulgaria, Sofia, 2005
- L.L. Ivanov. Antarctica: Livingston Island and Greenwich, Robert, Snow and Smith Islands. Scale 1:120000 topographic map. Troyan: Manfred Wörner Foundation, 2010. ISBN 978-954-92032-9-5 (First edition 2009. ISBN 978-954-92032-6-4)
- Antarctic Digital Database (ADD). Scale 1:250000 topographic map of Antarctica. Scientific Committee on Antarctic Research (SCAR), 1993–2016.
