= Lom Peak =

Peak in the South Shetland Islands, Antarctica

Location of Tangra Mountains on Livingston Island in the South Shetland Islands.

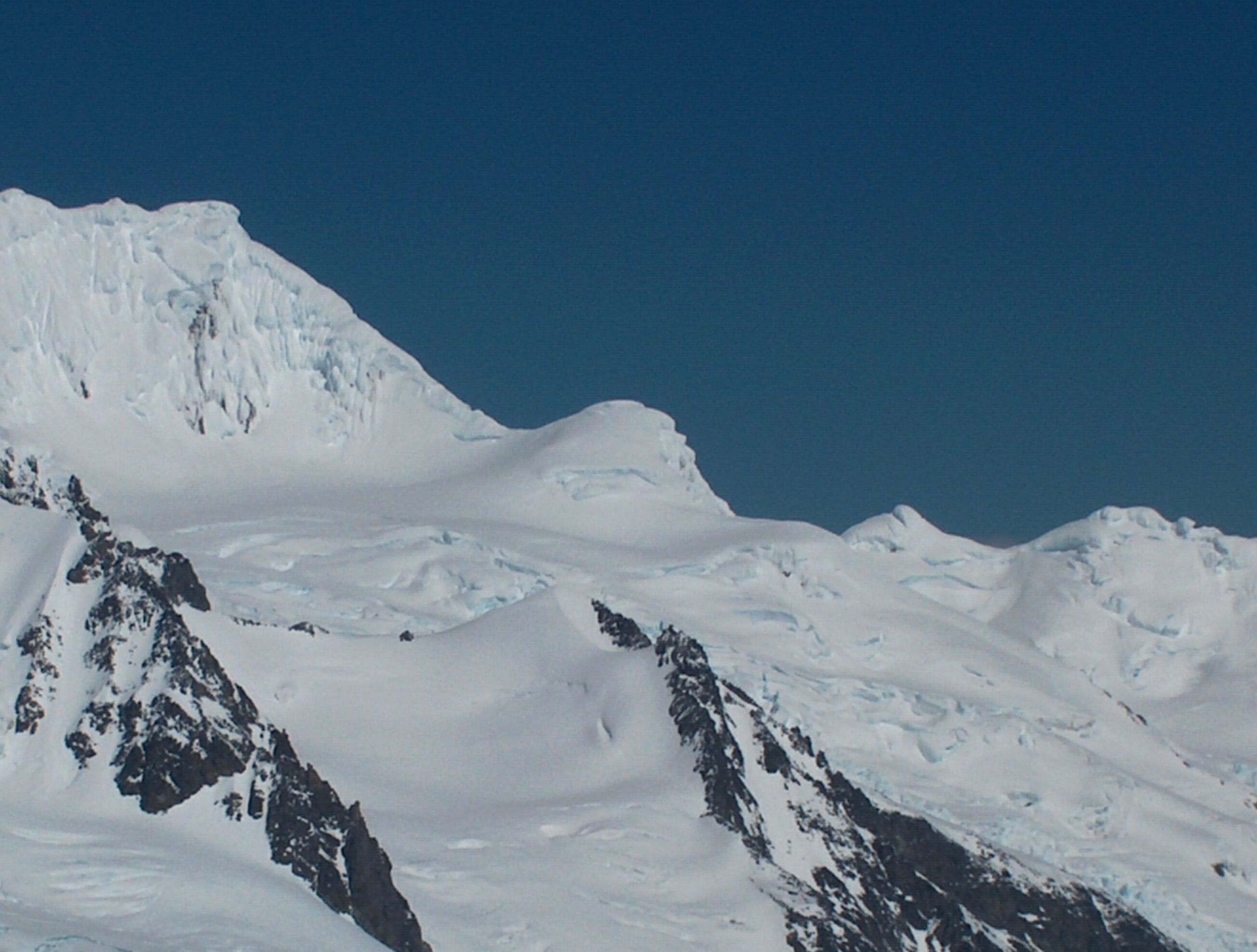
Lom Peak from Willan Saddle, with Kikish Crag in the foreground.

Topographic map of Livingston Island, Greenwich, Robert, Snow and Smith Islands.

Lom Peak (Bulgarian: връх Лом, romanized: vrah Lom, IPA: [ˈvrɤx ˈɫɔm]) is a peak rising to 870 m in Friesland Ridge, Tangra Mountains, Livingston Island in the South Shetland Islands, Antarctica which overlooks Ruen Icefall to the north. It is named after the Bulgarian town of Lom.

== Location ==
The peak is located at 62°42′42.7″S 60°15′33″W which is 790 m northwest of St. Methodius Peak, 790 m northeast of Tervel Peak and 1.88 km south of Kikish Crag (Bulgarian survey in 1995–96, and mapping in 2005 and 2009).

== Maps ==
- L.L. Ivanov et al. Antarctica: Livingston Island and Greenwich Island, South Shetland Islands. Scale 1:100000 topographic map. Sofia: Antarctic Place-names Commission of Bulgaria, 2005.
- L.L. Ivanov. Antarctica: Livingston Island and Greenwich, Robert, Snow and Smith Islands. Scale 1:120000 topographic map. Troyan: Manfred Wörner Foundation, 2009.
