= Orpheus Gate =

Pass in the South Shetland Islands, Antarctica

Location of Livingston Island in the South Shetland Islands

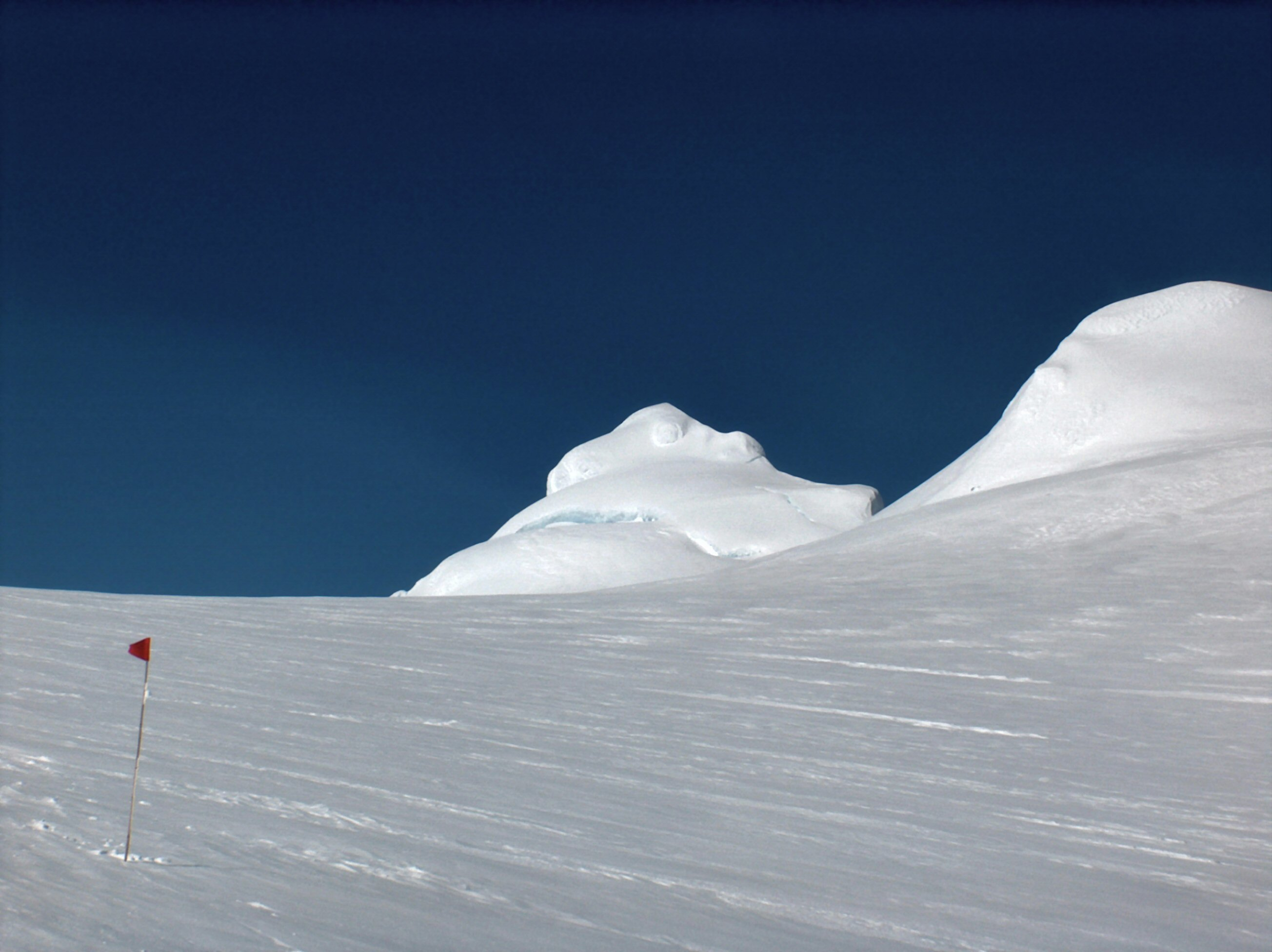
Orpheus Gate, with Pliska Ridge on the right

Topographic map of Livingston Island and Smith Island

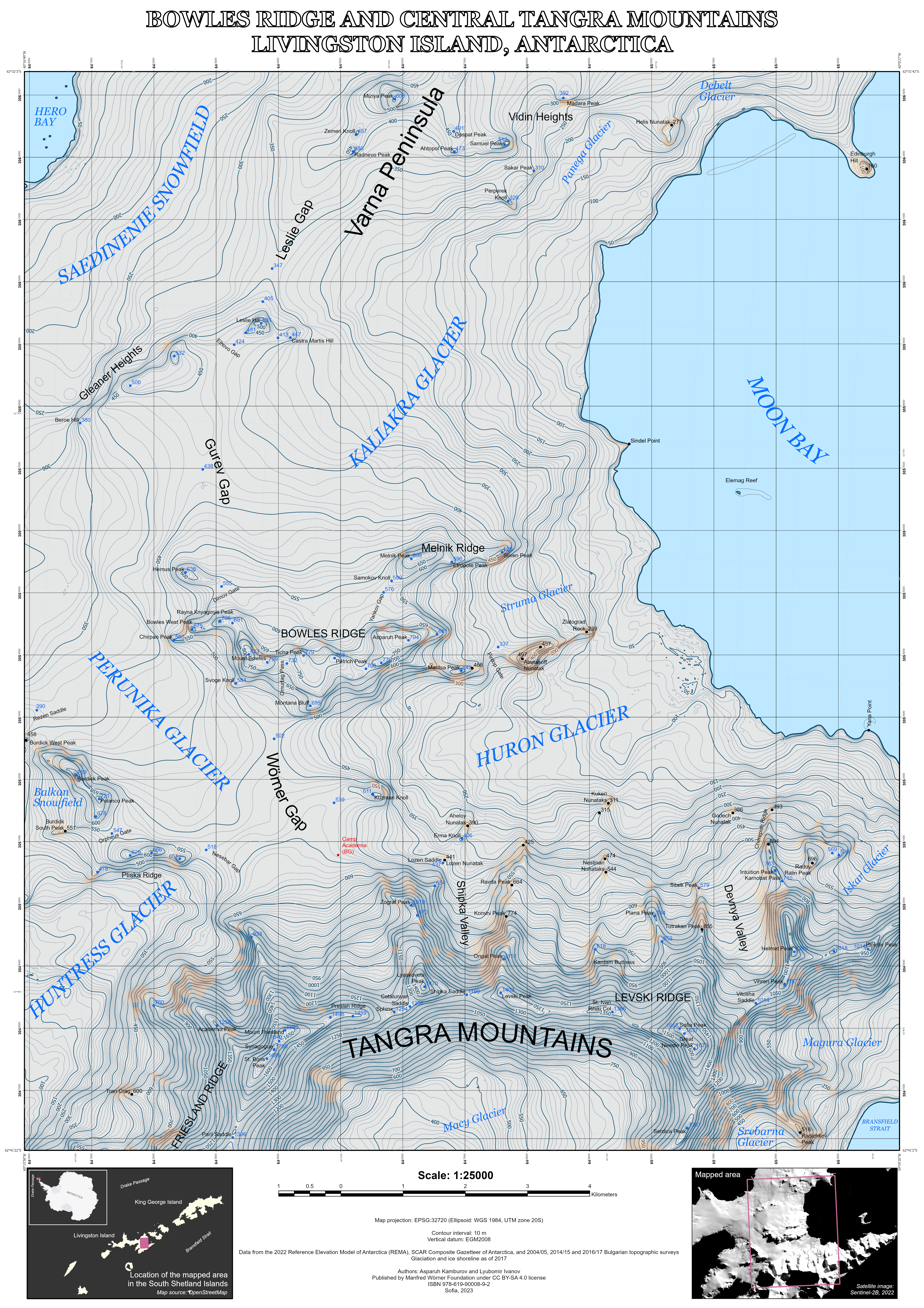
Topographic map of Bowles Ridge and central Tangra Mountains

Orpheus Gate (Orfeeva Porta \or-'fe-e-va 'por-ta\), also Orpheus Pass, is the 548 m high and 380 m wide pass in eastern Livingston Island in the South Shetland Islands, Antarctica, bounded by Pliska Ridge on the southeast and Polanco Peak in Burdick Ridge on the northwest, Huntress Glacier on the southwest and Perunika Glacier on the northeast.

The pass forms part of the overland routes from Hurd Peninsula via Willan Saddle, the southern foothills of Burdick South Peak, and Orpheus Gate to upper Perunika Glacier, Wörner Gap and Camp Academia area, upper Huron Glacier, Tangra Mountains and Bowles Ridge.

Orpheus, a name of world and national culture, was originally applied in 1995 to a nearby peak but, due to the priority of the existing British nameform Willan Nunatak, was subsequently transferred to the present feature.

== Location ==
The midpoint is located at 62°38′35″S 60°14′31″W, which is 6.3 km east of St. Kliment Ohridski base, 7.84 km east-northeast of Juan Carlos I base, 1.77 km east-northeast of Willan Saddle, 2.21 km southeast of Rezen Saddle, 3.87 km southwest of Omurtag Pass, 6.82 km west-southwest of Pirdop Gate, 3.61 km west of Camp Academia site, 5.29 km west of Lozen Saddle and 5.48 km northwest of Catalunyan Saddle (Detailed Spanish mapping in 1991, elevation and distances according to the Bulgarian topographic survey Tangra 2004/05).

First crossed by the Bulgarian Kuzman Tuhchiev from St. Kliment Ohridski Base during the 1993/94 season.

== Maps ==
- South Shetland Islands. Scale 1:200000 topographic map. DOS 610 Sheet W 62 60. Tolworth, UK, 1968.
- Islas Livingston y Decepción. Mapa topográfico a escala 1:100000. Madrid: Servicio Geográfico del Ejército, 1991.
- S. Soccol, D. Gildea and J. Bath. Livingston Island, Antarctica. Scale 1:100000 satellite map. The Omega Foundation, USA, 2004.
- L.L. Ivanov et al., Antarctica: Livingston Island and Greenwich Island, South Shetland Islands (from English Strait to Morton Strait, with illustrations and ice-cover distribution), 1:100000 scale topographic map, Antarctic Place-names Commission of Bulgaria, Sofia, 2005
- L.L. Ivanov. Antarctica: Livingston Island and Greenwich, Robert, Snow and Smith Islands. Scale 1:120000 topographic map. Troyan: Manfred Wörner Foundation, 2010. ISBN 978-954-92032-9-5 (First edition 2009. ISBN 978-954-92032-6-4)
- Antarctic Digital Database (ADD). Scale 1:250000 topographic map of Antarctica. Scientific Committee on Antarctic Research (SCAR). Since 1993, regularly upgraded and updated.
- L.L. Ivanov. Antarctica: Livingston Island and Smith Island. Scale 1:100000 topographic map. Manfred Wörner Foundation, 2017. ISBN 978-619-90008-3-0
- A. Kamburov and L. Ivanov. Bowles Ridge and Central Tangra Mountains: Livingston Island, Antarctica. Scale 1:25000 map. Sofia: Manfred Wörner Foundation, 2023. ISBN 978-619-90008-6-1
