= Troyan Peak =

Peak on Livingston Island in the South Shetland Islands, Antarctica

Location of Tangra Mountains on Livingston Island in the South Shetland Islands.

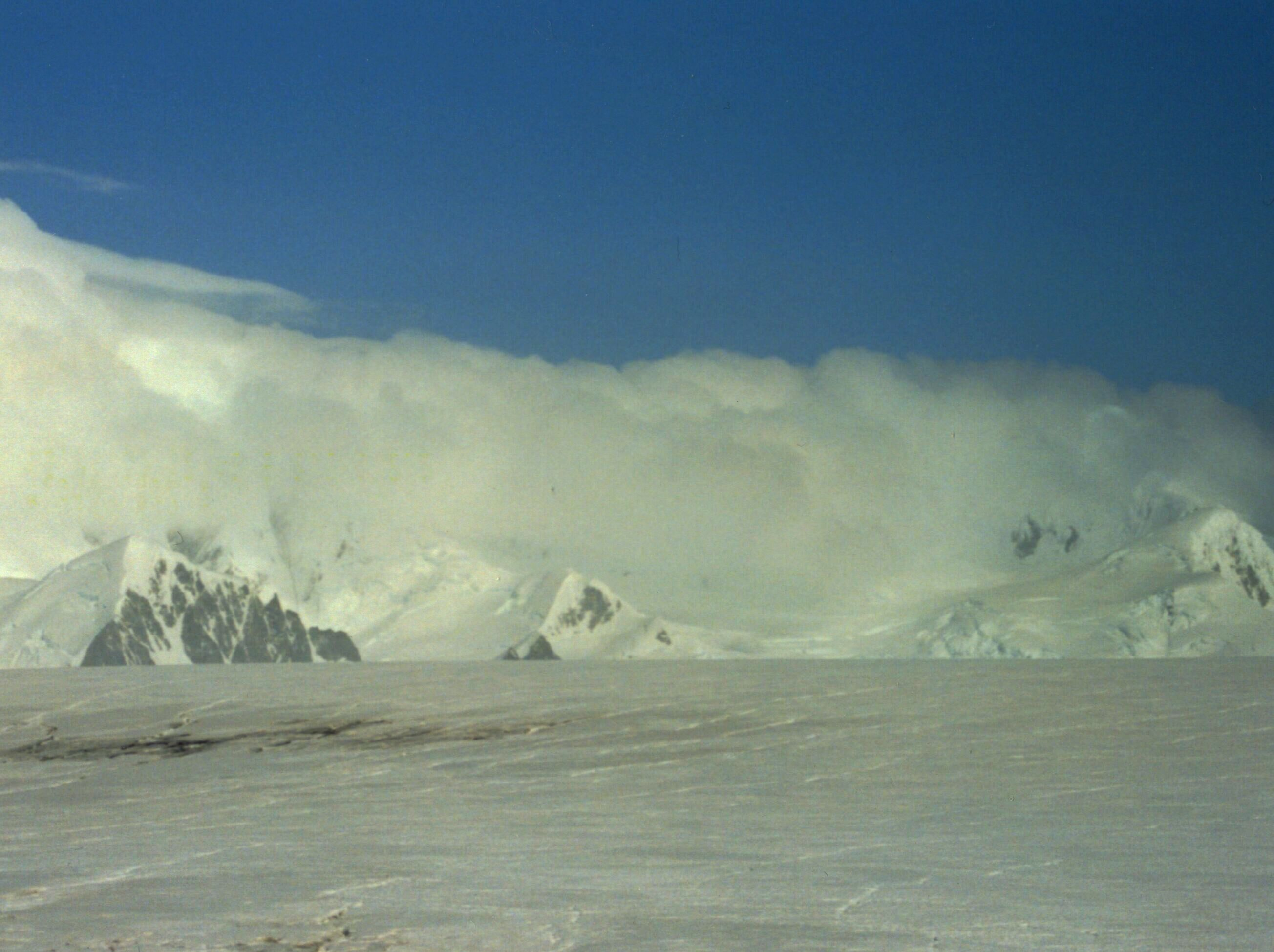
Troyan Peak from Balkan Snowfield, with Stambolov Crag on the left and Lom Peak on the right.

Topographic map of Livingston Island and Smith Island

Troyan Peak (Bulgarian: връх Троян, romanized: vrah Troyan, IPA: [ˈvrɤx troˈjan]) is a peak rising to 810 m in the Friesland Ridge of the Tangra Mountains in Livingston Island in the South Shetland Islands, Antarctica. It has a steep, snow-free west slope and surmounts the Ruen Icefall to the north, west and south. The peak is named after the Bulgarian town of Troyan.

== Location ==
The peak is located at 62°42′11.1″S 60°14′32″W, which is 1.42 km west by north of St. Cyril Peak, 1.44 km north of St. Methodius Peak, 1.31 km northeast of Lom Peak and 1.2 km south of Stambolov Crag (Bulgarian mapping in 2005 and 2009).

== Maps ==
- L.L. Ivanov et al. Antarctica: Livingston Island and Greenwich Island, South Shetland Islands. Scale 1:100000 topographic map. Sofia: Antarctic Place-names Commission of Bulgaria, 2005.
- L.L. Ivanov. Antarctica: Livingston Island and Greenwich, Robert, Snow and Smith Islands. Scale 1:120000 topographic map. Troyan: Manfred Wörner Foundation, 2010. ISBN 978-954-92032-9-5 (First edition 2009. ISBN 978-954-92032-6-4)
- Antarctic Digital Database (ADD). Scale 1:250000 topographic map of Antarctica. Scientific Committee on Antarctic Research (SCAR). Since 1993, regularly updated.
- L.L. Ivanov. Antarctica: Livingston Island and Smith Island. Scale 1:100000 topographic map. Manfred Wörner Foundation, 2017. ISBN 978-619-90008-3-0
