= Kikish Crag =

Peak in the South Shetland Islands, Antarctica

Location of Tangra Mountains on Livingston Island in the South Shetland Islands.

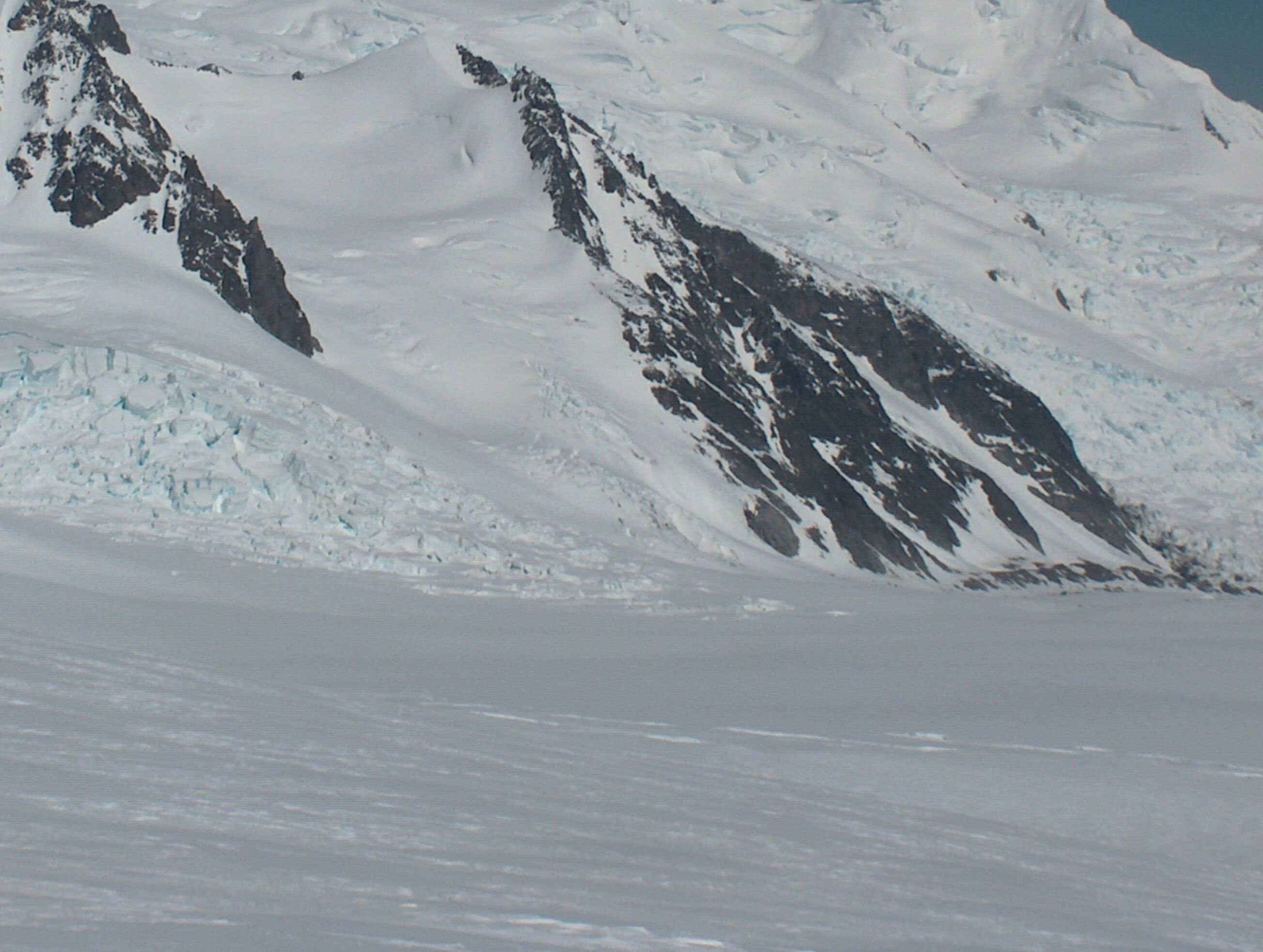
Kikish Crag from Willan Saddle.

Topographic map of Livingston Island, Greenwich, Robert, Snow and Smith Islands.

Kikish Crag (Bulgarian: връх vrah Kikish, IPA: [ˈvrɤx ˈkikiʃ]) is a peak rising to 650 m in Friesland Ridge, Tangra Mountains on Livingston Island in the South Shetland Islands, Antarctica and is named after Kikish site in Vitosha Mountain, Bulgaria.

== Location ==
The crag is located at 62°41′42″S 60°15′25″W which is 850 m west-southwest of Stambolov Crag, 2.38 km north of St. Methodius Peak and 4.35 km southeast of Napier Peak. Overlooking Huntress Glacier to the northwest, False Bay to the west, and Ruen Icefall to the south. Steep, snow-free west slope.

== Maps ==
- South Shetland Islands. Scale 1:200000 topographic map. DOS 610 Sheet W 62 60. Tolworth, UK, 1968.
- Islas Livingston y Decepción. Mapa topográfico a escala 1:100000. Madrid: Servicio Geográfico del Ejército, 1991.
- S. Soccol, D. Gildea and J. Bath. Livingston Island, Antarctica. Scale 1:100000 satellite map. The Omega Foundation, USA, 2004.
- L.L. Ivanov et al., Antarctica: Livingston Island and Greenwich Island, South Shetland Islands (from English Strait to Morton Strait, with illustrations and ice-cover distribution), 1:100000 scale topographic map, Antarctic Place-names Commission of Bulgaria, Sofia, 2005
- L.L. Ivanov. Antarctica: Livingston Island and Greenwich, Robert, Snow and Smith Islands. Scale 1:120000 topographic map. Troyan: Manfred Wörner Foundation, 2010. ISBN 978-954-92032-9-5 (First edition 2009. ISBN 978-954-92032-6-4)
- Antarctic Digital Database (ADD). Scale 1:250000 topographic map of Antarctica. Scientific Committee on Antarctic Research (SCAR), 1993–2016.
