= Willan Nunatak =

Ice-free tipped peak in the South Shetland Islands, Antarctica

Location of Livingston Island in the South Shetland Islands.

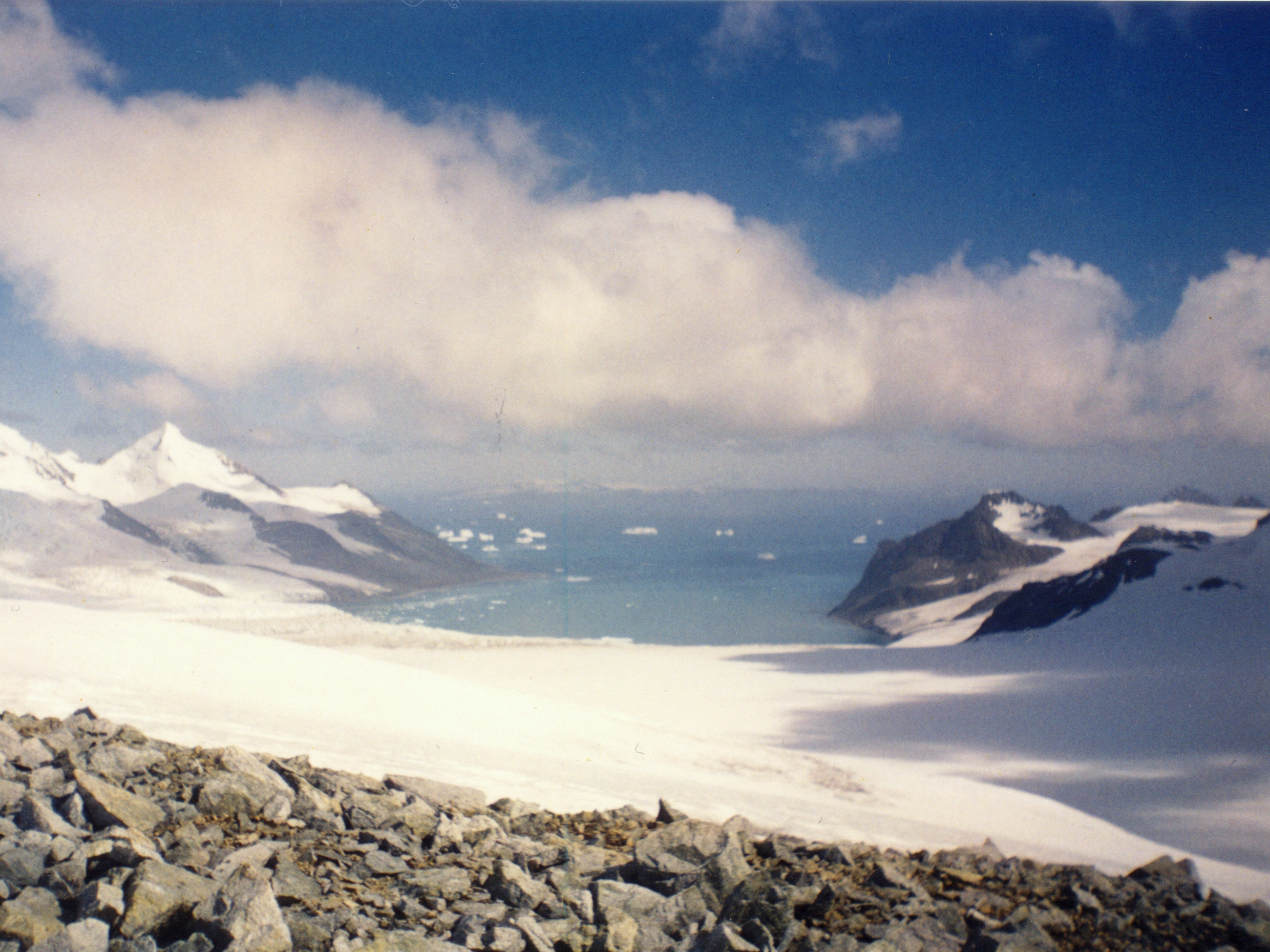
A view from Willan Nunatak towards Huntress Glacier and False Bay, with Deception Island in the background.

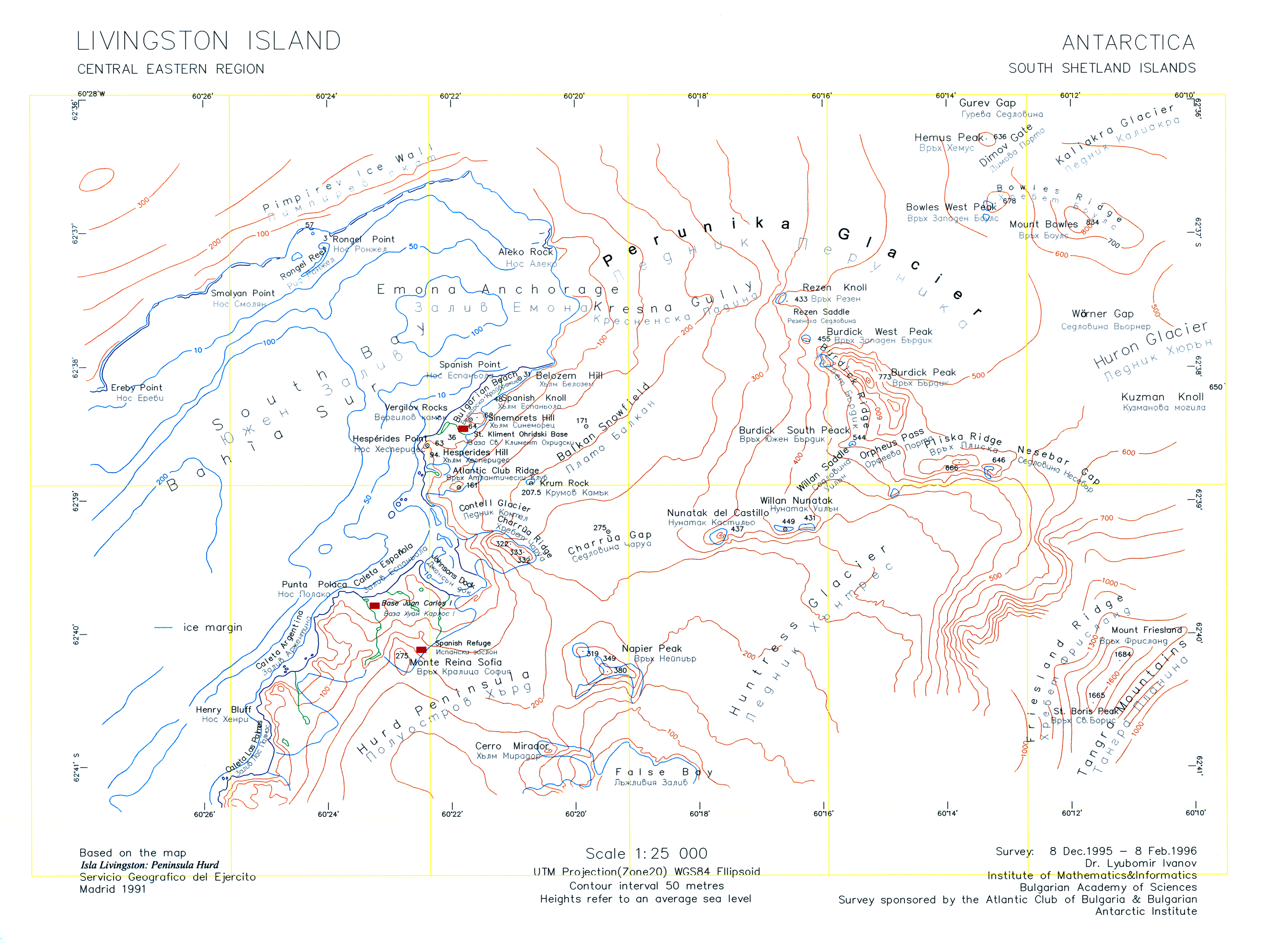
Topographic map of central-eastern Livingston Island featuring Willan Nunatak.

Topographic map of Livingston Island and Smith Island.

Willan Nunatak is an ice-free tipped peak rising to 449 m on the glacial divide between Huntress Glacier and Balkan Snowfield on Hurd Peninsula in eastern Livingston Island in the South Shetland Islands, Antarctica. It is linked to Burdick South Peak to the northeast by Willan Saddle and, via Castillo Nunatak and Charrúa Gap, to Charrúa Ridge to the west.

The nunatak is named after the British geologist Robert Charles Richard Willan (b. 1952) who has carried out field work in the area.

== Location ==
The peak is located at 62°39′13.7″S 60°16′32″W which is 890 m east of Castillo Nunatak, 4.66 km east-southeast of Sinemorets Hill, 2.36 km south-southwest of Burdick Peak, 2.48 km west-southwest of Pliska Peak, 4.96 km west-northwest of Mount Friesland, 4.63 km north-northwest of Stambolov Crag and 3.21 km northeast of Napier Peak. British mapping in 1968, Spanish in 1991, and Bulgarian topographic survey in 1995/96 and mapping in 1996, 2005 and 2009.

== Maps ==
- South Shetland Islands. Scale 1:200000 topographic map. DOS 610 Sheet W 62 60. Tolworth, UK, 1968.
- Isla Livingston: Península Hurd. Mapa topográfico de escala 1:25000. Madrid: Servicio Geográfico del Ejército, 1991. (Map reproduced on p. 16 of the linked work)
- L.L. Ivanov. Livingston Island: Central-Eastern Region. Scale 1:25000 topographic map. Sofia: Antarctic Place-names Commission of Bulgaria, 1996.
- L.L. Ivanov et al. Antarctica: Livingston Island and Greenwich Island, South Shetland Islands. Scale 1:100000 topographic map. Sofia: Antarctic Place-names Commission of Bulgaria, 2005.
- L.L. Ivanov. Antarctica: Livingston Island and Greenwich, Robert, Snow and Smith Islands. Scale 1:120000 topographic map. Troyan: Manfred Wörner Foundation, 2009. ISBN 978-954-92032-6-4
- Antarctic Digital Database (ADD). Scale 1:250000 topographic map of Antarctica. Scientific Committee on Antarctic Research (SCAR). Since 1993, regularly upgraded and updated.
- L.L. Ivanov. Antarctica: Livingston Island and Smith Island. Scale 1:100000 topographic map. Manfred Wörner Foundation, 2017. ISBN 978-619-90008-3-0
