= Nesebar Gap =

Nesebar Gap, eastern Livingston Island, South Shetland Islands, Antarctica

Location of Tangra Mountains on Livingston Island in the South Shetland Islands.

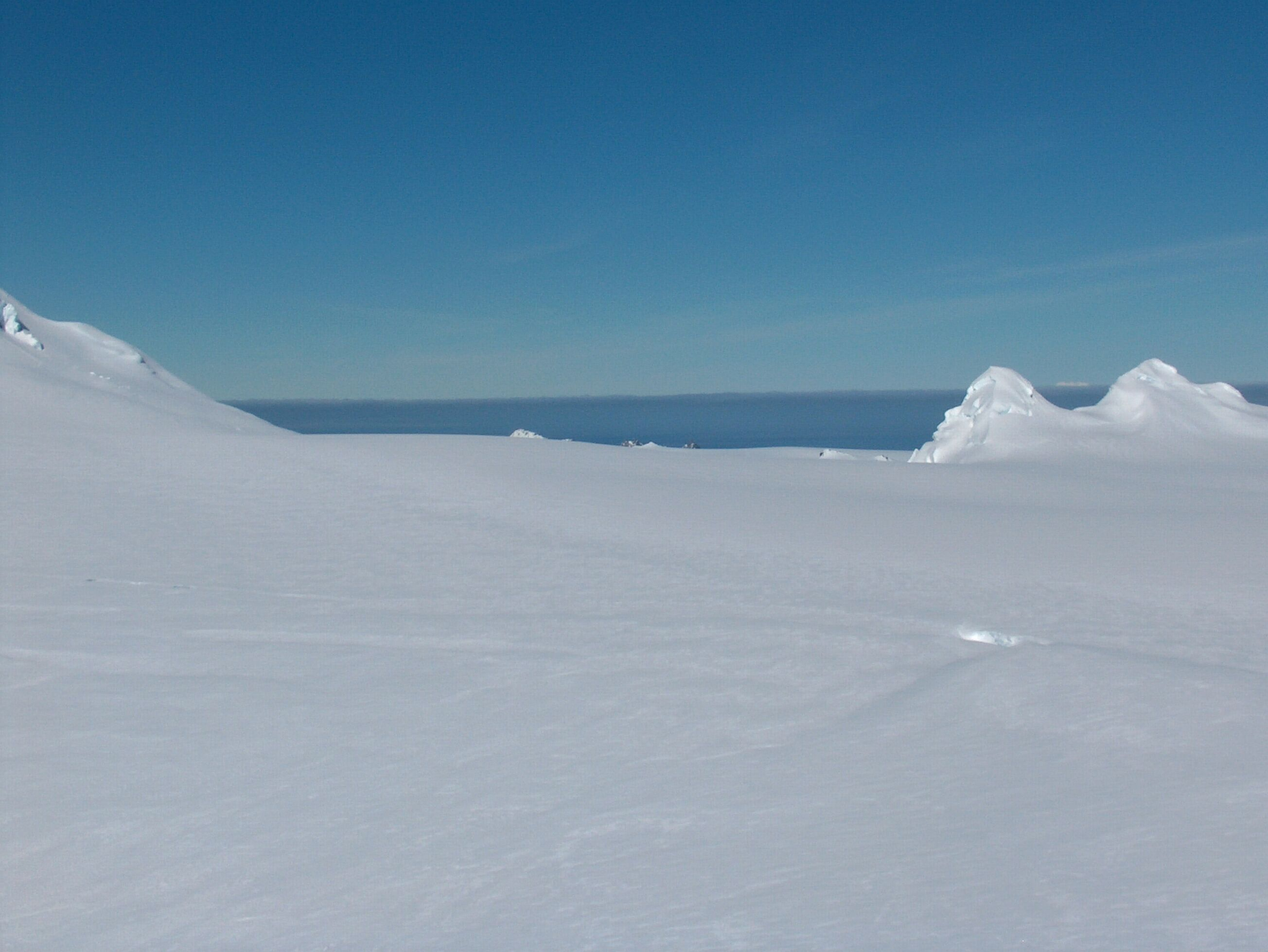
Nesebar Gap from Kuzman Knoll, with Pliska Ridge on the right.

Topographic map of Livingston Island and Smith Island.

Nesebar Gap (Sedlovina Nesebar \se-dlo-vi-'na ne-'se-b&r\) is a 1.3 km wide gap in eastern Livingston Island in the South Shetland Islands, Antarctica bounded to the west by Pliska Ridge and to the east by the northern slope of Mount Friesland, Tangra Mountains. It is part of the divide between the glacial catchments of Perunika Glacier to the north and Huntress Glacier to the south. The gap is part of an overland route between Orpheus Gate to the west, and Camp Academia locality and Lozen Saddle to the east.

The Nesebar Gap was first mapped in detail by the Spanish Servicio Geográfico del Ejército in 1991. Nesebar is the name of a town on the Bulgarian Black Sea Coast.

== Location ==
The gap is located at 62°38′43″S 60°12′16″W (Elevation 550 m).

== Maps ==
- L.L. Ivanov et al. Antarctica: Livingston Island and Greenwich Island, South Shetland Islands. Scale 1:100000 topographic map. Sofia: Antarctic Place-names Commission of Bulgaria, 2005.
- L.L. Ivanov. Antarctica: Livingston Island and Greenwich, Robert, Snow and Smith Islands. Scale 1:120000 topographic map. Troyan: Manfred Wörner Foundation, 2009. ISBN 978-954-92032-6-4
- Antarctic Digital Database (ADD). Scale 1:250000 topographic map of Antarctica. Scientific Committee on Antarctic Research (SCAR). Since 1993, regularly upgraded and updated.
- L.L. Ivanov. Antarctica: Livingston Island and Smith Island. Scale 1:100000 topographic map. Manfred Wörner Foundation, 2017. ISBN 978-619-90008-3-0
- A. Kamburov and L. Ivanov. Bowles Ridge and Central Tangra Mountains: Livingston Island, Antarctica. Scale 1:25000 map. Sofia: Manfred Wörner Foundation, 2023. ISBN 978-619-90008-6-1
