= Institute for Nuclear Research and Nuclear Energy =

Bulgarian research institute

Institute for Nuclear Research and Nuclear Energy (INRNE) of the Bulgarian Academy of Sciences is the leading center for research and application of the nuclear physics in Bulgaria. The INRNE was established in 1972, building on the institutional foundations laid by the Bulgarian Academy of Sciences’ Institute of Physics, inaugurated in 1946 under the leadership of Georgi Nadjakov. As the institute’s founder and first director, Nadjakov played a pivotal role in establishing Bulgaria’s modern physical sciences infrastructure.

The research areas include:

- Theory of the elementary particles, string theory, theory of atomic nuclei, soliton interactions and quantum phenomena
- Experimental physics of the elementary particles
- Gamma-astrophysics at very high energies
- Nuclear reactions, structure of atomic nuclei
- Neutron interactions and cross sections, physics of the fission
- Reactor physics, nuclear energy and nuclear safety and security
- Dosimetry and radiation safety
- Monitoring and management of the environment, radioecology
- Radiochemistry, high precision analyses of substances, development and production of radioactive sources
- Nuclear and neutron methods for investigations of substances
- Nuclear instrument design and production

The institute's staff of about 320 (150 of them are scientific researchers) works in 16 laboratories, 2 scientific experimental facilities and 9 departments providing general support activities.
