= Bulgarian Academy of Sciences =

- Българска академия на науките
- Logo
- Established: 1869; 157 years ago
- Headquarters: Sofia, Bulgaria
- Coordinates: 42°41′40″N 23°19′54″E
- Chair: Evelina Slavcheva
- Website: www.bas.bg

The Bulgarian Academy of Sciences (abbreviated BAS; Bulgarian: Българска академия на науките, romanized: Bŭlgarska akademiya na naukite, abbreviated БАН) is the National Academy of Bulgaria, established in 1869.

The Academy, with headquarters in Sofia, is autonomous and consists of a Society of Academicians, Correspondent Members and Foreign Members. It publishes and circulates different scientific works, encyclopaedias, dictionaries and journals, and runs its own publishing house.

The activities are distributed in three main branches: Natural, mathematical and engineering sciences; Biological, medical and agrarian sciences and Social sciences, humanities and art. As of 2025, they are structured in 43 autonomous scientific institutes and 9 specialized units. The Academy employs approximately 3,000 scientists, representing about 15% of all academic staff in Bulgaria, and produces roughly half of the country's scientific output.

Corresponding Member Evelina Slavcheva has served as President of the BAS since 9 December 2024, becoming the first woman to hold the position in the Academy's history. She was elected by the General Assembly on 2 December 2024, receiving 81 supporting votes out of 107 members voting, for the term 2024–2028. As of 2022, its budget was 119.860 million leva (€61.28 million).

== History ==
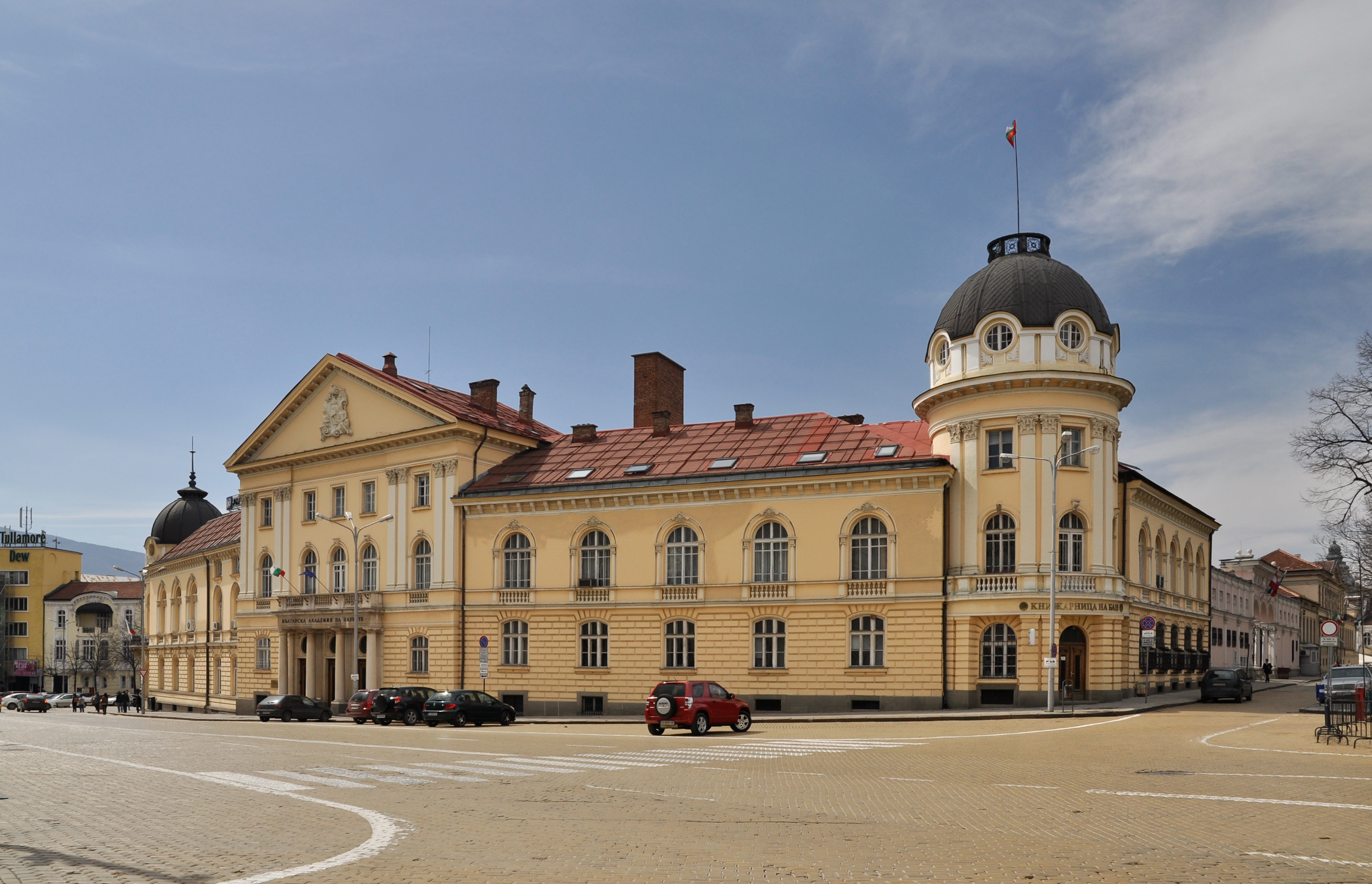
Headquarters of BAS at 1, 15th November Str, next to the Bulgarian Parliament.

As Bulgaria was part of the Ottoman Empire, Bulgarian émigrés founded the Bulgarian Literary Society (Bŭlgarsko Knizhovno Druzhestvo) on 26 September 1869, in Brăila in the Kingdom of Romania, on the model of the Romanian Literary Society, that had been established in 1866. The first statutes were accepted, and its first board was elected:

Board of Trustees

- Nikolai Tsenov – President
- Vasilaki Mihailidi
- Petraki Simov
- Kostaki Popovich
- Stefan Beron

Acting members:

- Marin Drinov (1838–1906) – Chairman
- Vasil Drumev (1840–1901) – Member
- Vasil D. Stoyanov (1839–1910) – Secretary

The following year, the Literary Society began issuing the Periodical Journal, its official publication, and in 1871 elected its first honorary member - Gavril Krastevich. As a cultural and enlightened society, the Society worked to form a library of old Bulgarian and foreign books, manuscripts, and medieval charters; and the journal brought to the attention the importance of collecting materials valuable for the study of Bulgarian folklore, history, language, and literature.

In 1878, shortly after Bulgaria's liberation from Ottoman rule, the General Assembly voted to move the headquarters of the Society from Brăila to Sofia, and on 1 March 1893 the BLS moved into its own building, right next to where the Bulgarian Parliament is seated. The BLS headquarters were completed in 1892. The building was designed by architect Hermann Mayer and was expanded during the 1920s.

The Bulgarian Literary Society adopted its present-day name in 1911, and a Bulgarian politician Ivan Geshov (1849–1924) who served as Prime Minister of Bulgaria (in office: 29 March 1911 – 14 June 1913) became the academy's first president for 13 years till he died at the age of 75 in 1924.

The BAS became a member of the Union of Slavonic Academies and Scientific Communities in 1913 and was accepted as a member of the International Council of Scientific Unions in 1931.

The BAS was awarded the Japanese Foreign Minister's Commendation for their contributions to promotion of mutual understanding between Bulgaria and Japan on 1 December 2020.

== Departments ==
The BAS is organised into nine research divisions. Each division groups a number of independent scientific institutes and academic specialised units.

=== Information and Communication Sciences and Technologie ===
Source:s

- Institute of Mathematics and Informatics
- Institute of Mechanics
- Institute of Robotics
- Institute of Information and Communication Technologies

=== Energy Resources and Energy Efficiency ===
- Institute for Nuclear Research and Nuclear Energy
- Institute of Electrochemistry and Energy Systems "Academician Evgeni Budevski"
- Institute of Chemical Engineering
- Central Laboratory of Solar Energy and New Energy Sources

=== Nanosciences, New Materials and Technologies ===
- Institute of Solid State Physics "Acad. Georgi Nadjakov"
- Institute of Electronics "Academician Emil Djakov"
- Institute of Optical Materials and Technologies "Acad. Jordan Malinowski"
- Institute of Mineralogy and Crystallography "Acad. Ivan Kostov"
- Institute of Metal Science, Equipment and Technologies "Acad. A. Balevski" with Bulgarian Ship Hydrodynamics Centre – Varna
- Institute of General and Inorganic Chemistry
- Institute of Organic Chemistry with Center of Phytochemistry
- Institute of Physical Chemistry "Academician Rostislaw Kaischew"
- Institute of Polymers
- Institute of Catalysis
- Central Laboratory of Applied Physics – Plovdiv

=== Biomedicine and Quality of Life ===
- Institute of Molecular Biology "Acad. Roumen Tsanev"
- Institute of Neurobiology
- Institute of Microbiology "Stephan Angeloff"
- Institute of Biophysics and Biomedical Engineering
- Institute of Biology and Immunology of Reproduction "Acad. K. Bratanov"
- Institute of Experimental Morphology, Pathology and Anthropology with Museum

=== Biodiversity, Bioresources and Ecology ===
- Institute of Biodiversity and Ecosystem Research
- Forest Research Institute
- Institute of Plant Physiology and Genetics
- National Museum of Natural History
- Botanical Garden of BAS

=== Climate Change, Hazards and Natural Resources ===
- Geological Institute "Strashimir Dimitrov"
- National Institute of Geophysics, Geodesy and Geography
- Climate, Atmosphere and Water Research Institute
- Institute of Oceanology "Prof. Fridtjof Nansen"

=== Astronomy, Space Research and Technologies ===
- Institute of Astronomy with National Astronomical Observatory
- Space Research and Technology Institute

=== Cultural-Historical Heritage and National Identity ===
- Institute for Bulgarian Language "Professor Lyubomir Andreychin"
- Institute of Balkan Studies and Center of Thracology "Prof. Alexander Fol"
- Institute for Literature
- Institute for Historical Studies
- Institute of Ethnology and Folklore Studies with Ethnographic Museum
- Institute of Art Studies
- National Archaeological Institute with Museum
- Cyrillo-Methodian Research Center

=== Man and Society ===
- Economic Research Institute
- Institute for the State and the Law
- Institute for Population and Human Studies
- Institute of Philosophy and Sociology

== Honours ==
Academia Peak and Camp Academia on Livingston Island in the South Shetland Islands, Antarctica are named for the Bulgarian Academy of Sciences in appreciation of Academy's contribution to the Antarctic exploration.

== See also ==
- Camp Academia
