= Pliska Ridge =

Three-peaked ridge in the South Shetland Islands, Antarctica

Location of Livingston Island in the South Shetland Islands

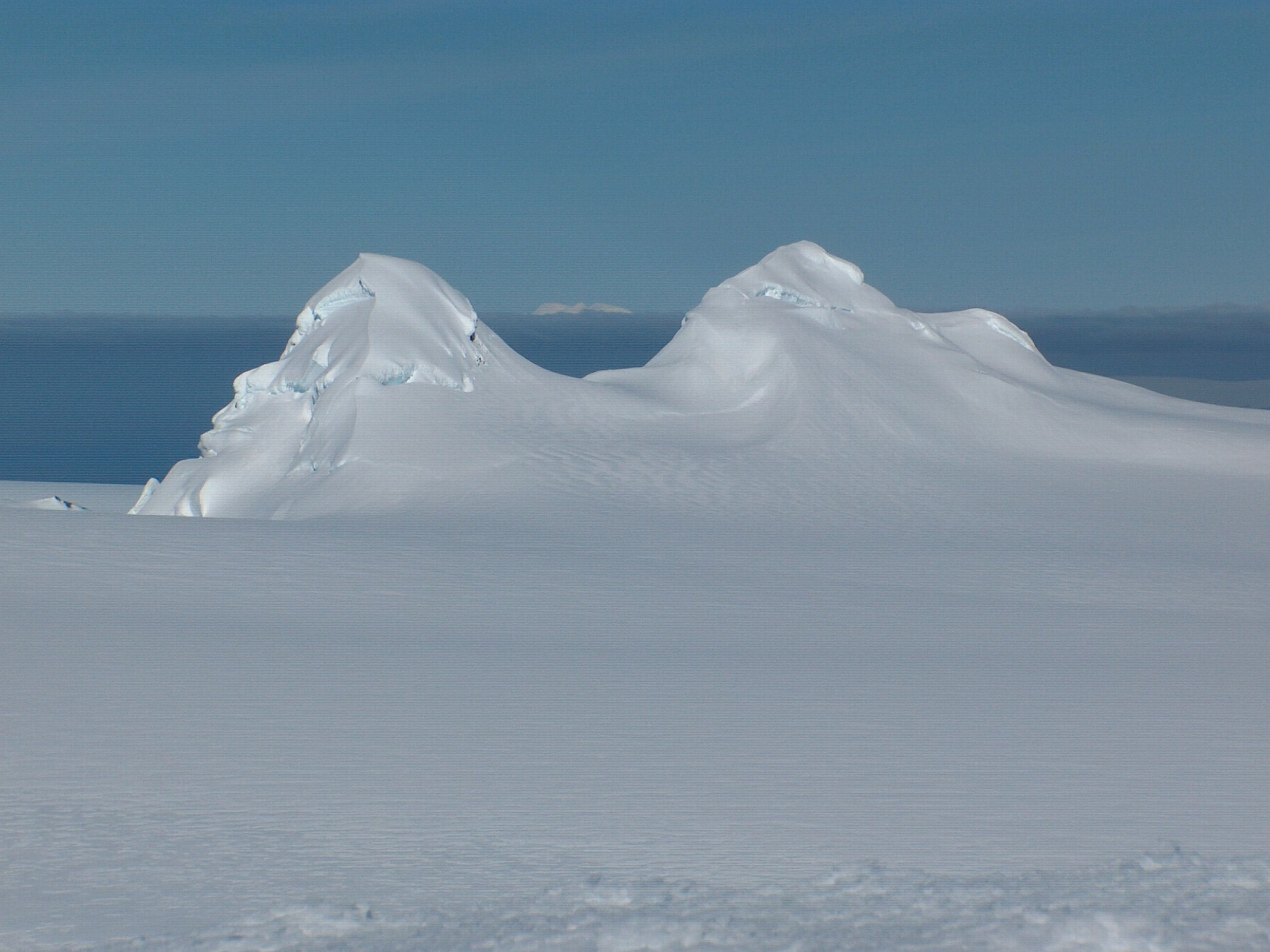
Pliska Ridge from Kuzman Knoll, with Wörner Gap and upper Perunika Glacier in the foreground

Topographic map of Livingston Island and Smith Island

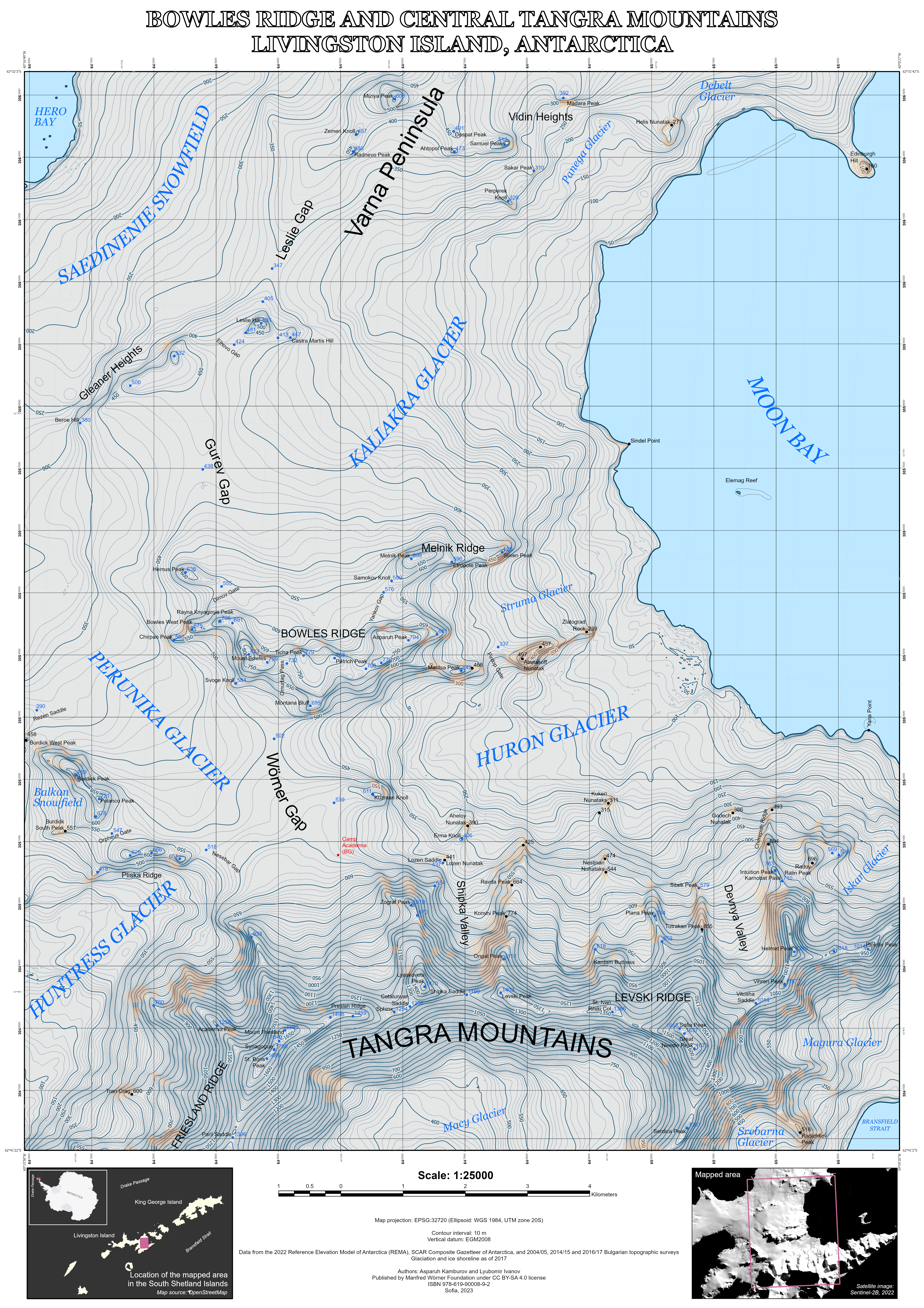
Topographic map of Bowles Ridge and central Tangra Mountains

Pliska Ridge (Bulgarian: връх Плиска, romanized: vrah Pliska, IPA: [ˈvrɤx ˈpliskɐ]) is a three-peaked ridge rising to 667 m (2,188 ft) in eastern Livingston Island in the South Shetland Islands, Antarctica. Its central and highest summit, Pliska Peak, is located 2.48 km (1.54 mi) east-northeast of Willan Nunatak (449 m (1,473 ft)), 1.81 km (1.12 mi) southeast of Burdick Peak (773 m (2,536 ft), summit of Burdick Ridge), 3.53 km (2.19 mi) south-southwest of Mount Bowles, 3.68 km (2.29 mi) west-southwest of Kuzman Knoll, and 3.61 km (2.24 mi) northwest of Mount Friesland. The feature is 1.6 km (0.99 mi) long and 500 m (1,600 ft) wide, its axis trending due east-west, with precipitous southern slopes. It is ice-covered except for segments of its easternmost peak (646 m (2,119 ft)) and is bounded to the northwest by Orpheus Gate, to the north by the head of Perunika Glacier, to the east by Nesebar Gap, and to the south and west by the head of Huntress Glacier, the latter flowing 6 km (3.7 mi) southwestwards into False Bay.

First ascent by the Bulgarian Lyubomir Ivanov from Camp Academia on 18 December 2004.

Pliska is the name of a settlement in north-eastern Bulgaria, which in the seventh century became the capital of the First Bulgarian Empire.

== Location ==
The summit Pliska Peak of the ridge is located at 62°38′44″S 60°13′49″W (Rough British mapping in 1968, detailed Spanish mapping in 1991, Bulgarian mapping in 1996, 2005 and 2009 from topographic surveys in 1995/96 and 2004/05).

== Maps ==
- Isla Livingston: Península Hurd. Mapa topográfico de escala 1:25000. Madrid: Servicio Geográfico del Ejército, 1991. (Map reproduced on p. 16 of the linked work)
- L.L. Ivanov. Livingston Island: Central-Eastern Region. Scale 1:25000 topographic map. Sofia: Antarctic Place-names Commission of Bulgaria, 1996.
- L.L. Ivanov et al. Antarctica: Livingston Island and Greenwich Island, South Shetland Islands. Scale 1:100000 topographic map. Sofia: Antarctic Place-names Commission of Bulgaria, 2005.
- L.L. Ivanov. Antarctica: Livingston Island and Greenwich, Robert, Snow and Smith Islands. Scale 1:120000 topographic map. Troyan: Manfred Wörner Foundation, 2009. ISBN 978-954-92032-6-4
- Antarctic Digital Database (ADD). Scale 1:250000 topographic map of Antarctica. Scientific Committee on Antarctic Research (SCAR). Since 1993, regularly upgraded and updated.
- L.L. Ivanov. Antarctica: Livingston Island and Smith Island. Scale 1:100000 topographic map. Manfred Wörner Foundation, 2017. ISBN 978-619-90008-3-0
- A. Kamburov and L. Ivanov. Bowles Ridge and Central Tangra Mountains: Livingston Island, Antarctica. Scale 1:25000 map. Sofia: Manfred Wörner Foundation, 2023. ISBN 978-619-90008-6-1
