= Perunika Glacier =

Glacier in Antarctica

- Location of Livingston Island in the South Shetland Islands

- Location within South Shetland Islands Location within Antarctica
- Location: Livingston Island; South Shetland Islands
- Coordinates: 62°36′45″S 60°15′48″W
- Length: 4.3 nautical miles (8.0 km; 4.9 mi)
- Width: 1.6 nautical miles (3.0 km; 1.8 mi)
- Thickness: unknown
- Terminus: Emona Anchorage
- Status: unknown

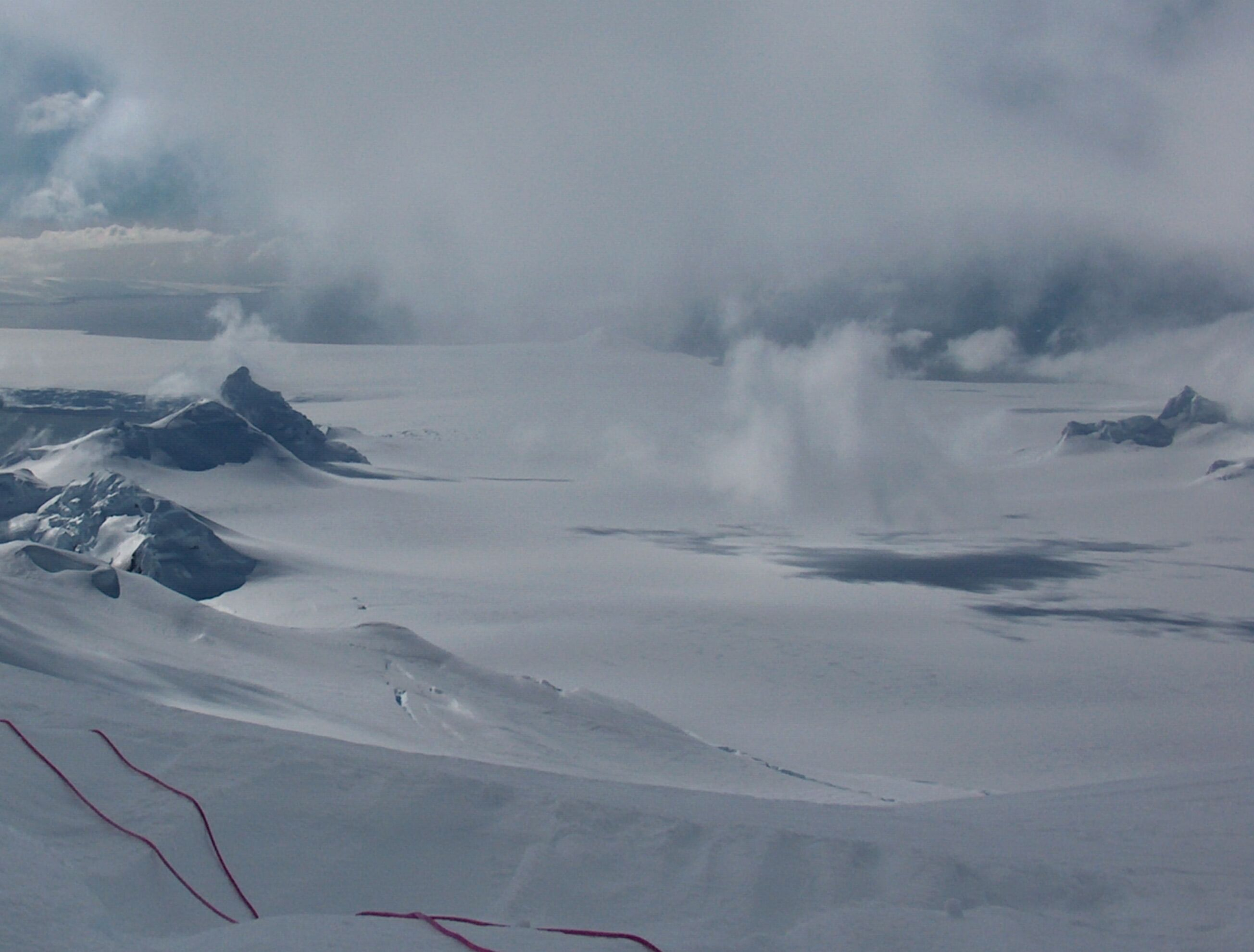
Upper Perunika Glacier from Catalunyan Saddle.

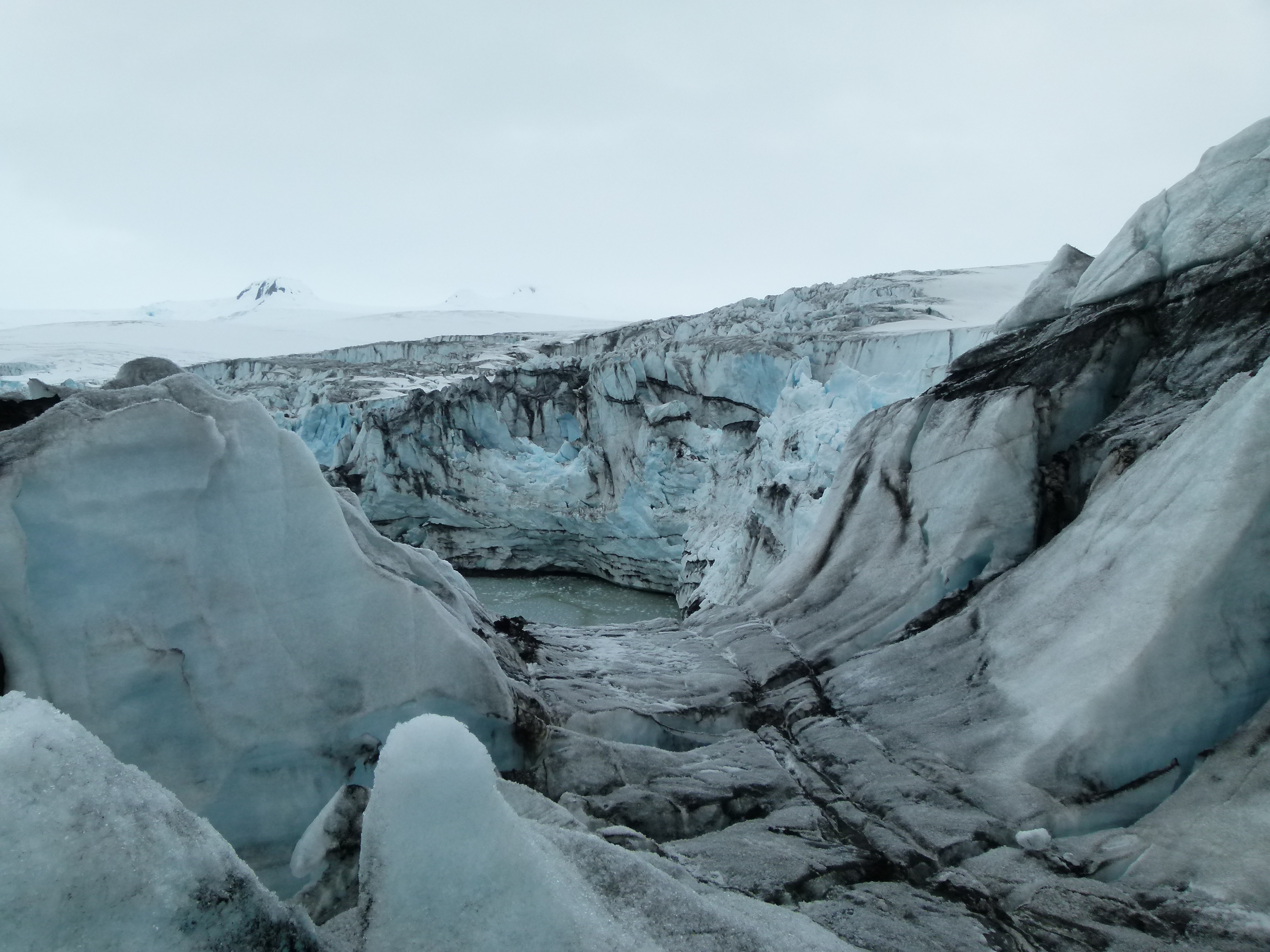
At the glacier's terminus.

Topographic map of Livingston Island and Smith Island

Perunika Glacier (Bulgarian: ледник Перуника, romanized: lednik Perunika, IPA: [ˈlɛdnik pɛroˈnikɐ]) is an 8 km long and 3 km wide (average) roughly crescent-shaped glacier in eastern Livingston Island in the South Shetland Islands, Antarctica situated east of Pimpirev Glacier, south of Saedinenie Snowfield, southwest of Kaliakra Glacier, west of Huron Glacier, and north of Balkan Snowfield and the head of Huntress Glacier.

Its head is bounded by Pliska Ridge to the south-southwest, Nesebar Gap to the south, Wörner Gap to the east, and Bowles Ridge to the north-northeast. It drains northwestwards between Burdick Ridge and Bowles Ridge, then north of Rezen Knoll turns west-southwest and flows into the head of Emona Anchorage between Bulgarian Beach and Pimpirev Beach.

The glacier is heavily crevassed in its lower half, receiving ice influx also from Balkan Snowfield and from the part of the island’s ice cap that is located west of Hemus Peak and Gurev Gap and south of Saedinenie Snowfield, and is draining southwards. It exhibits pyroclastic phenomena typical of the region’s glaciology and resulting from volcanic activities at Deception Island not 40 km away.

The glacier was mapped by the Spanish Servicio Geográfico del Ejército in 1991, the lower portion in greater detail. Bulgarian remapping of Perunika Glacier’s terminus from a survey made during the summer of 1995-96; mapping in 2005 and 2009 from the Bulgarian topographic survey Tangra 2004/05.

Perunika is the name of a village in the Rhodope Mountains in southern Bulgaria. A derivation of Perun, the name of ancient Slavic God.

== Location ==
The glacier is centred at 62°36′45″S 60°15′48″W.

== See also ==
- List of glaciers in the Antarctic
- Glaciology

== Maps ==
- Isla Livingston: Península Hurd. Mapa topográfico de escala 1:25 000. Madrid: Servicio Geográfico del Ejército, 1991.
- L.L. Ivanov. Livingston Island: Central-Eastern Region. Scale 1:25000 topographic map. Sofia: Antarctic Place-names Commission of Bulgaria, 1996.
- L.L. Ivanov et al. Antarctica: Livingston Island and Greenwich Island, South Shetland Islands. Scale 1:100000 topographic map. Sofia: Antarctic Place-names Commission of Bulgaria, 2005.
- L.L. Ivanov. Antarctica: Livingston Island and Greenwich, Robert, Snow and Smith Islands. Scale 1:120000 topographic map. Troyan: Manfred Wörner Foundation, 2010. ISBN 978-954-92032-9-5 (First edition 2009. ISBN 978-954-92032-6-4)
- Antarctic Digital Database (ADD). Scale 1:250000 topographic map of Antarctica. Scientific Committee on Antarctic Research (SCAR). Since 1993, regularly upgraded and updated.
- L.L. Ivanov. Antarctica: Livingston Island and Smith Island. Scale 1:100000 topographic map. Manfred Wörner Foundation, 2017. ISBN 978-619-90008-3-0
- A. Kamburov and L. Ivanov. Bowles Ridge and Central Tangra Mountains: Livingston Island, Antarctica. Scale 1:25000 map. Sofia: Manfred Wörner Foundation, 2023. ISBN 978-619-90008-6-1

== Honours ==
Perunika Glacier Street in the city of Sofia is named after the feature.
