= Burdick Peak =

Mountain in the South Shetland Islands

Coordinates: 62°38′6.6″S 60°15′19″W

Location of Livingston Island in the South Shetland Islands.

Topographic map of Livingston Island and Smith Island.

Burdick Peak is the summit of Burdick Ridge rising to 773 m southwest of Mount Bowles on Livingston Island in the South Shetland Islands, Antarctica. It was named by the UK Antarctic Place-names Committee in 1958 for Christopher Burdick, Master of the American schooner Huntress of Nantucket, who visited the South Shetland Islands in 1820–21.

== Maps ==
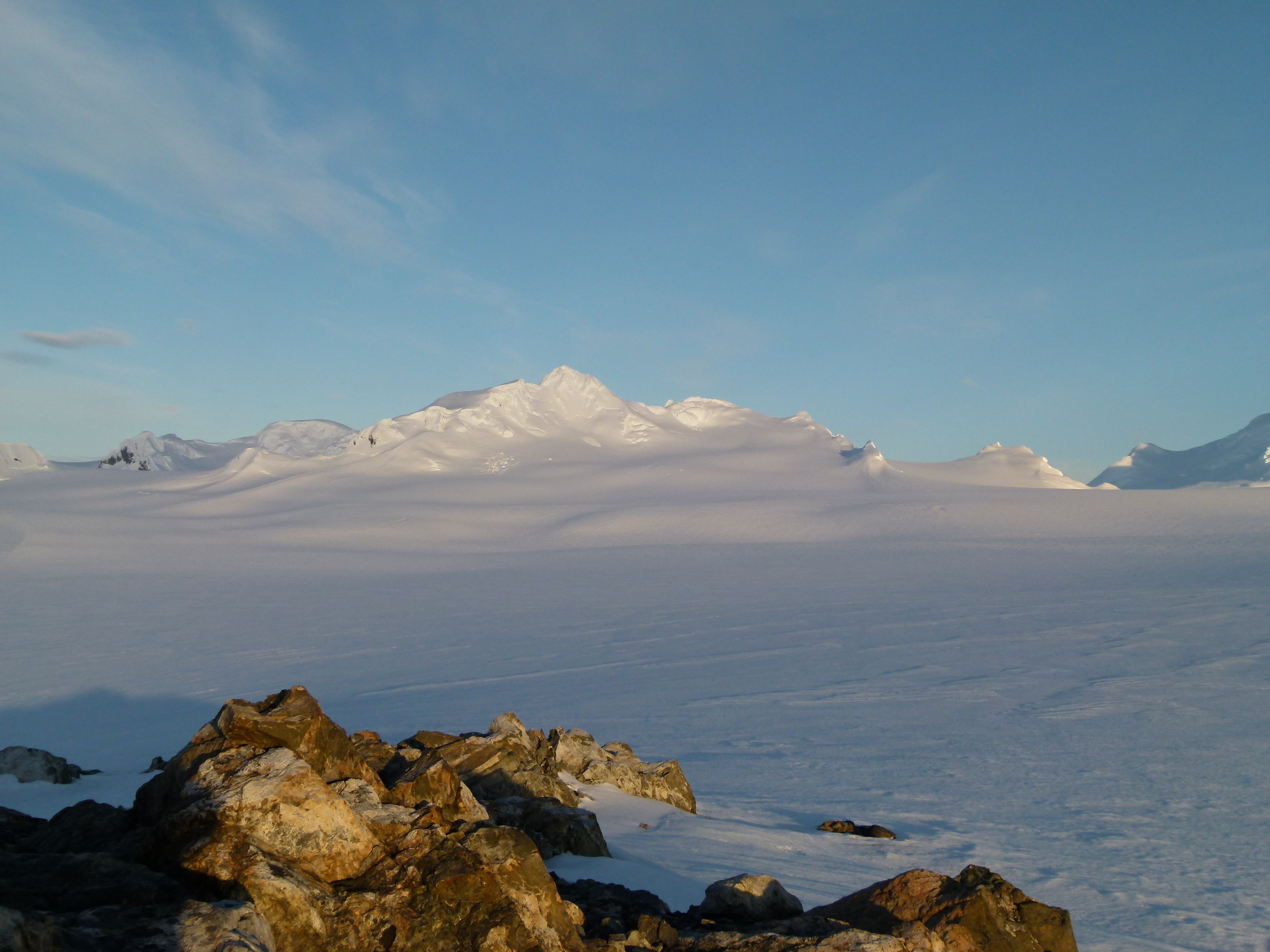
Burdick Ridge from Krumov Kamak.

- Isla Livingston: Península Hurd. Mapa topográfico de escala 1:25000. Madrid: Servicio Geográfico del Ejército, 1991. (Map reproduced on p. 16 of the linked work)
- L.L. Ivanov et al. Antarctica: Livingston Island and Greenwich Island, South Shetland Islands. Scale 1:100000 topographic map. Sofia: Antarctic Place-names Commission of Bulgaria, 2005.
- L.L. Ivanov. Antarctica: Livingston Island and Greenwich, Robert, Snow and Smith Islands. Scale 1:120000 topographic map. Troyan: Manfred Wörner Foundation, 2009. ISBN 978-954-92032-6-4
- Antarctic Digital Database (ADD). Scale 1:250000 topographic map of Antarctica. Scientific Committee on Antarctic Research (SCAR). Since 1993, regularly upgraded and updated.
- L.L. Ivanov. Antarctica: Livingston Island and Smith Island. Scale 1:100000 topographic map. Manfred Wörner Foundation, 2017. ISBN 978-619-90008-3-0
- A. Kamburov and L. Ivanov. Bowles Ridge and Central Tangra Mountains: Livingston Island, Antarctica. Scale 1:25000 map. Sofia: Manfred Wörner Foundation, 2023. ISBN 978-619-90008-6-1
