= Burdick Ridge =

Feature in South Shetland Islands, Antarctica

Coordinates: 62.635°S 60.258°W

Location of Livingston Island in the South Shetland Islands.

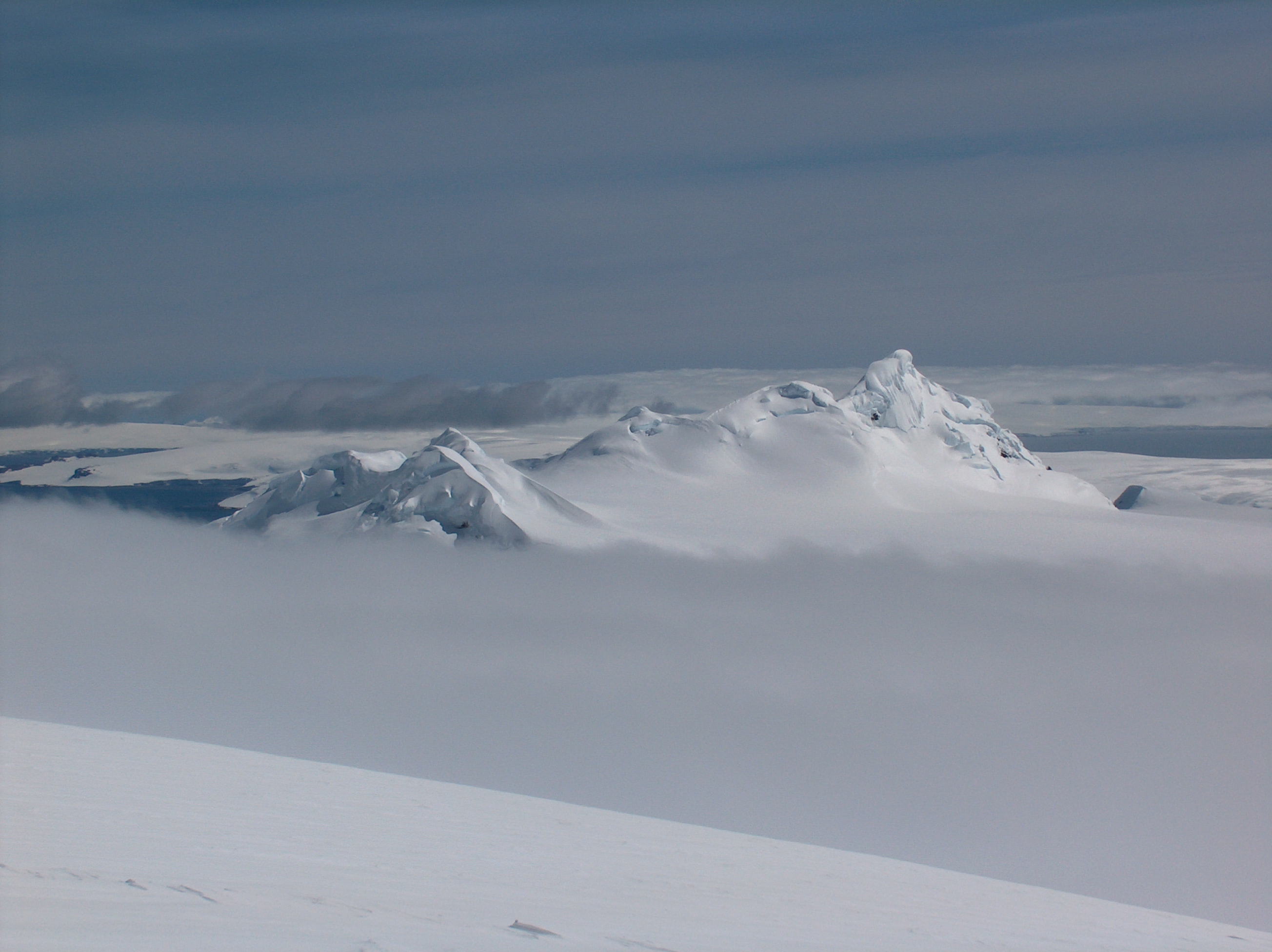
Burdick Ridge from the north slopes of Presian Ridge.

Topographic map of Livingston Island and Smith Island.

Burdick Ridge is a ridge rising to an elevation of 773 metres (2,536 ft) on Livingston Island in the South Shetland Islands. Extending for 1.9 kilometres (1.2 mi) between Orpheus Gate in the southeast and Rezen Saddle in the northwest, it is bounded by Perunika Glacier to the northeast and Balkan Snowfield to the southwest. It takes its name from its highest point, Burdick Peak.

It was first ascended by the Bulgarian Kuzman Tuhchiev from St. Kliment Ohridski Base during the 1993–94 season.

== Maps ==
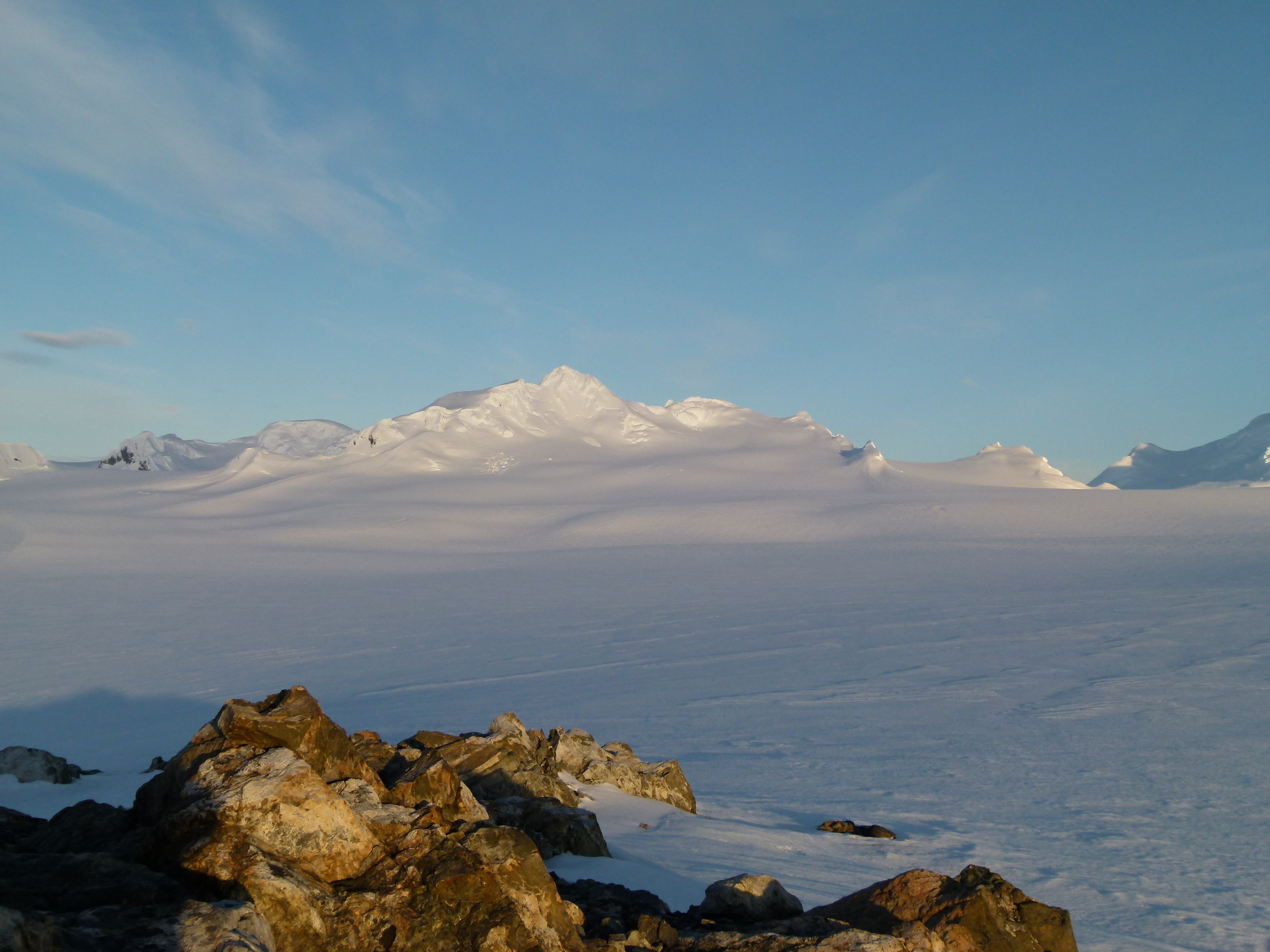
Burdick Ridge from Krumov Kamak.

- Isla Livingston: Península Hurd. Mapa topográfico de escala 1:25000. Madrid: Servicio Geográfico del Ejército, 1991. (Map reproduced on p. 16 of the linked work)
- L.L. Ivanov et al. Antarctica: Livingston Island and Greenwich Island, South Shetland Islands. Scale 1:100000 topographic map. Sofia: Antarctic Place-names Commission of Bulgaria, 2005.
- L.L. Ivanov. Antarctica: Livingston Island and Greenwich, Robert, Snow and Smith Islands. Scale 1:120000 topographic map. Troyan: Manfred Wörner Foundation, 2009. ISBN 978-954-92032-6-4
- Antarctic Digital Database (ADD). Scale 1:250000 topographic map of Antarctica. Scientific Committee on Antarctic Research (SCAR). Since 1993, regularly upgraded and updated.
- L.L. Ivanov. Antarctica: Livingston Island and Smith Island. Scale 1:100000 topographic map. Manfred Wörner Foundation, 2017. ISBN 978-619-90008-3-0
