= Willan Saddle =

Flat crescent-shaped and ice-covered saddle in the South Shetland Islands, Antarctica

Location of Livingston Island in the South Shetland Islands.

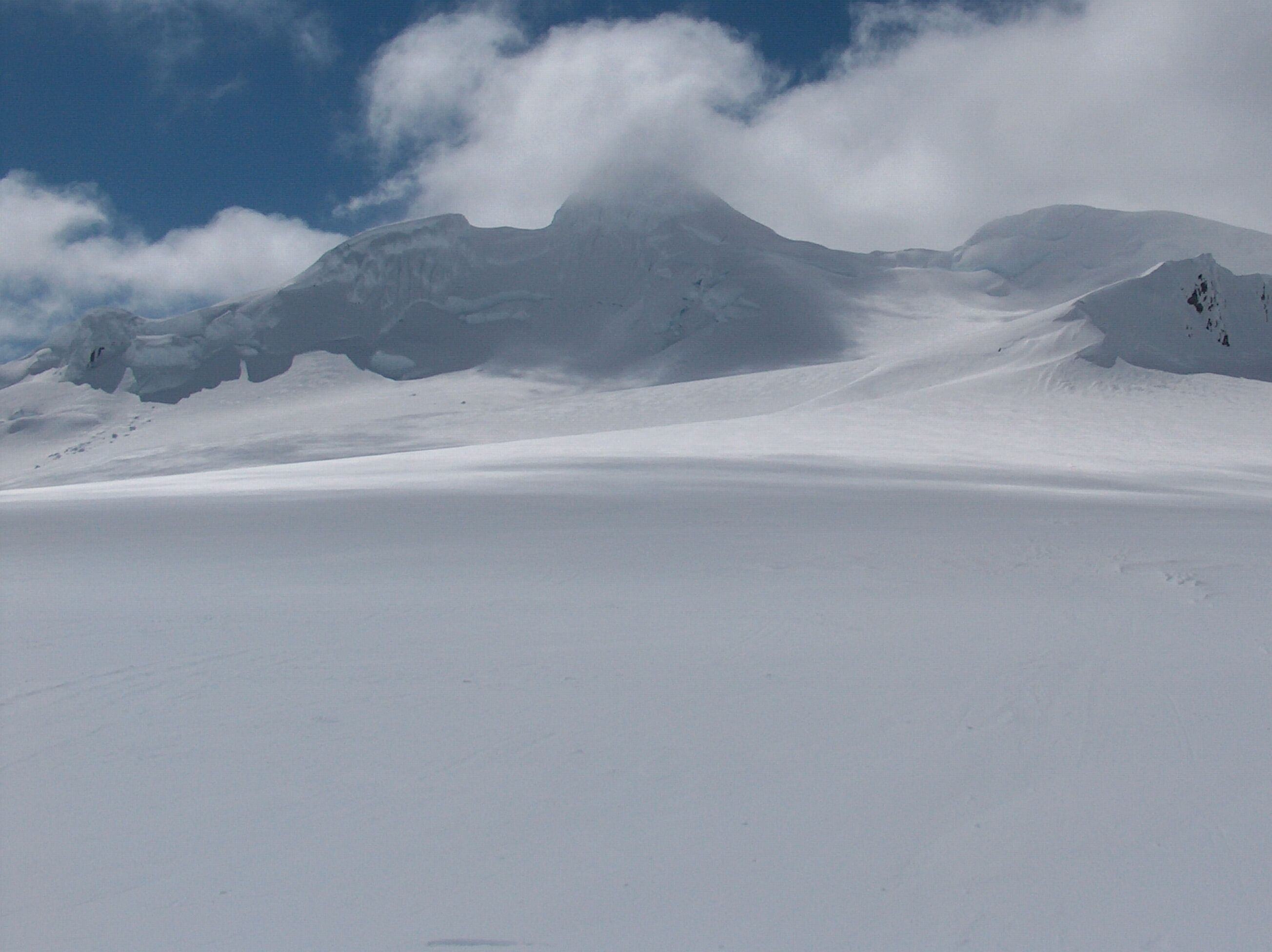
Willan Saddle from near Willan Nunatak, with Burdick Ridge in the background.

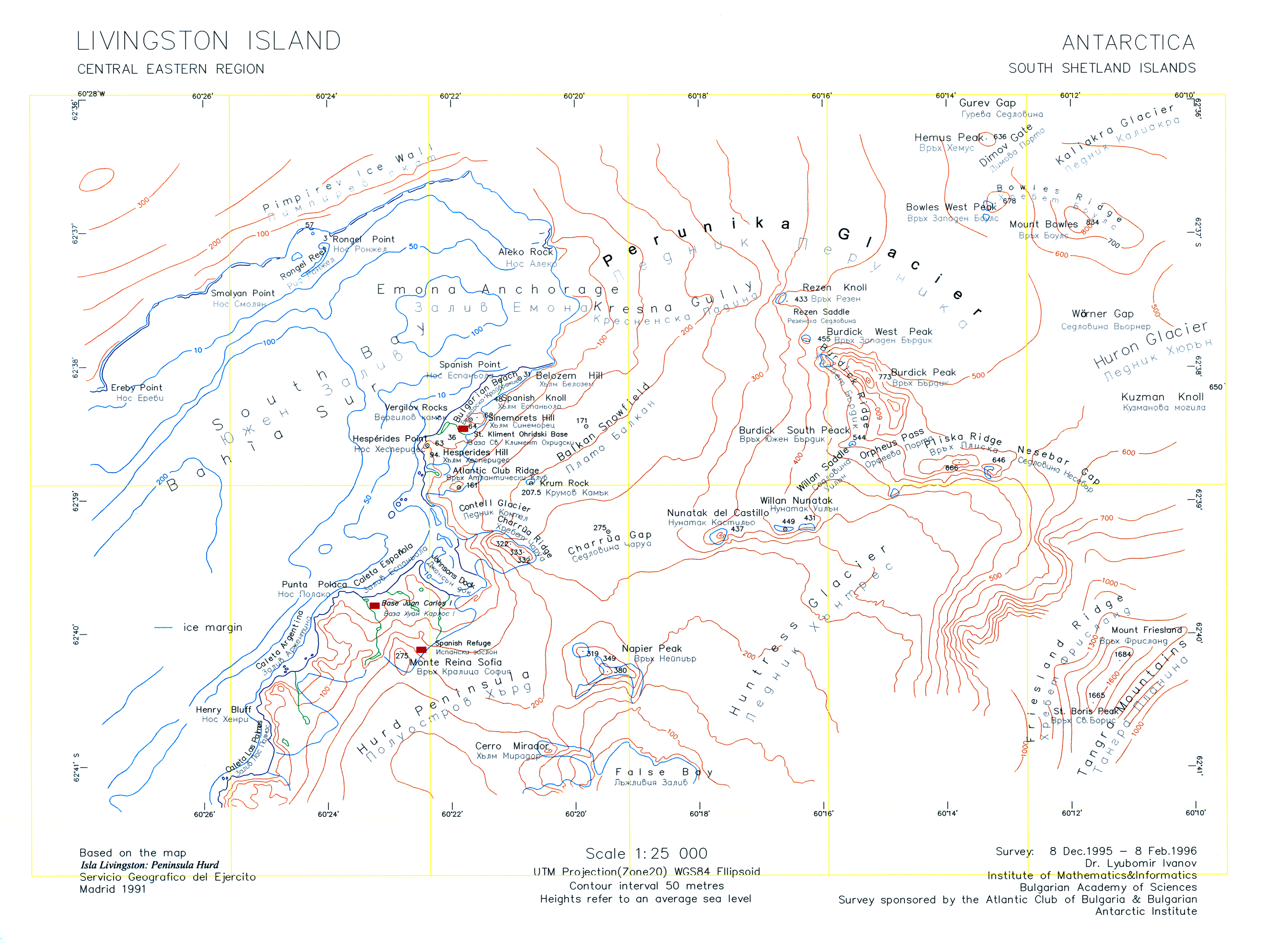
Topographic map of central-eastern Livingston Island featuring Willan Saddle.

Topographic map of Livingston Island and Smith Island.

Willan Saddle (Sedlovina Willan \se-dlo-vi-'na 'wi-l&n\) is a flat, crescent-shaped and ice-covered saddle extending 1 km in the northeast–southwest direction between Burdick South Peak and Willan Nunatak in eastern Livingston Island in the South Shetland Islands, Antarctica. The saddle has an elevation of 400 m and is part of the overland route between Balkan Snowfield and Charrúa Gap in the west and Orpheus Gate in the east, thus providing access from the Bulgarian Base and the Spanish Base to the interior of eastern Livingston Island.

The feature takes its name from the adjacent Willan Nunatak.

== Location ==
The saddle's midpoint is located at 62°38′56.1″S 60°16′27.4″W (Mapped in detail by the Spanish Servicio Geográfico del Ejército in 1991, Bulgarian topographic surveys in 1995/96 and 2004/05, and mapping in 1996, 2005 and 2009).

== Maps ==
- South Shetland Islands. Scale 1:200000 topographic map. DOS 610 Sheet W 62 60. Tolworth, UK, 1968.
- Isla Livingston: Península Hurd. Mapa topográfico de escala 1:25000. Madrid: Servicio Geográfico del Ejército, 1991. (Map reproduced on p. 16 of the linked work)
- L.L. Ivanov. Livingston Island: Central-Eastern Region. Scale 1:25000 topographic map. Sofia: Antarctic Place-names Commission of Bulgaria, 1996.
- L.L. Ivanov et al. Antarctica: Livingston Island and Greenwich Island, South Shetland Islands. Scale 1:100000 topographic map. Sofia: Antarctic Place-names Commission of Bulgaria, 2005.
- L.L. Ivanov. Antarctica: Livingston Island and Greenwich, Robert, Snow and Smith Islands. Scale 1:120000 topographic map. Troyan: Manfred Wörner Foundation, 2009. ISBN 978-954-92032-6-4
- Antarctic Digital Database (ADD). Scale 1:250000 topographic map of Antarctica. Scientific Committee on Antarctic Research (SCAR). Since 1993, regularly upgraded and updated.
- L.L. Ivanov. Antarctica: Livingston Island and Smith Island. Scale 1:100000 topographic map. Manfred Wörner Foundation, 2017. ISBN 978-619-90008-3-0
