= Huntress Glacier =

Glacier in Antarctica

- Location of Livingston Island in the South Shetland Islands

- Location within South Shetland Islands Location within Antarctica
- Location: Livingston Island; South Shetland Islands
- Coordinates: 62°40′00″S 60°15′45″W
- Length: 4.3 nautical miles (8.0 km; 4.9 mi)
- Width: 2.3 nautical miles (4.3 km; 2.6 mi)
- Thickness: unknown
- Terminus: False Bay
- Status: unknown

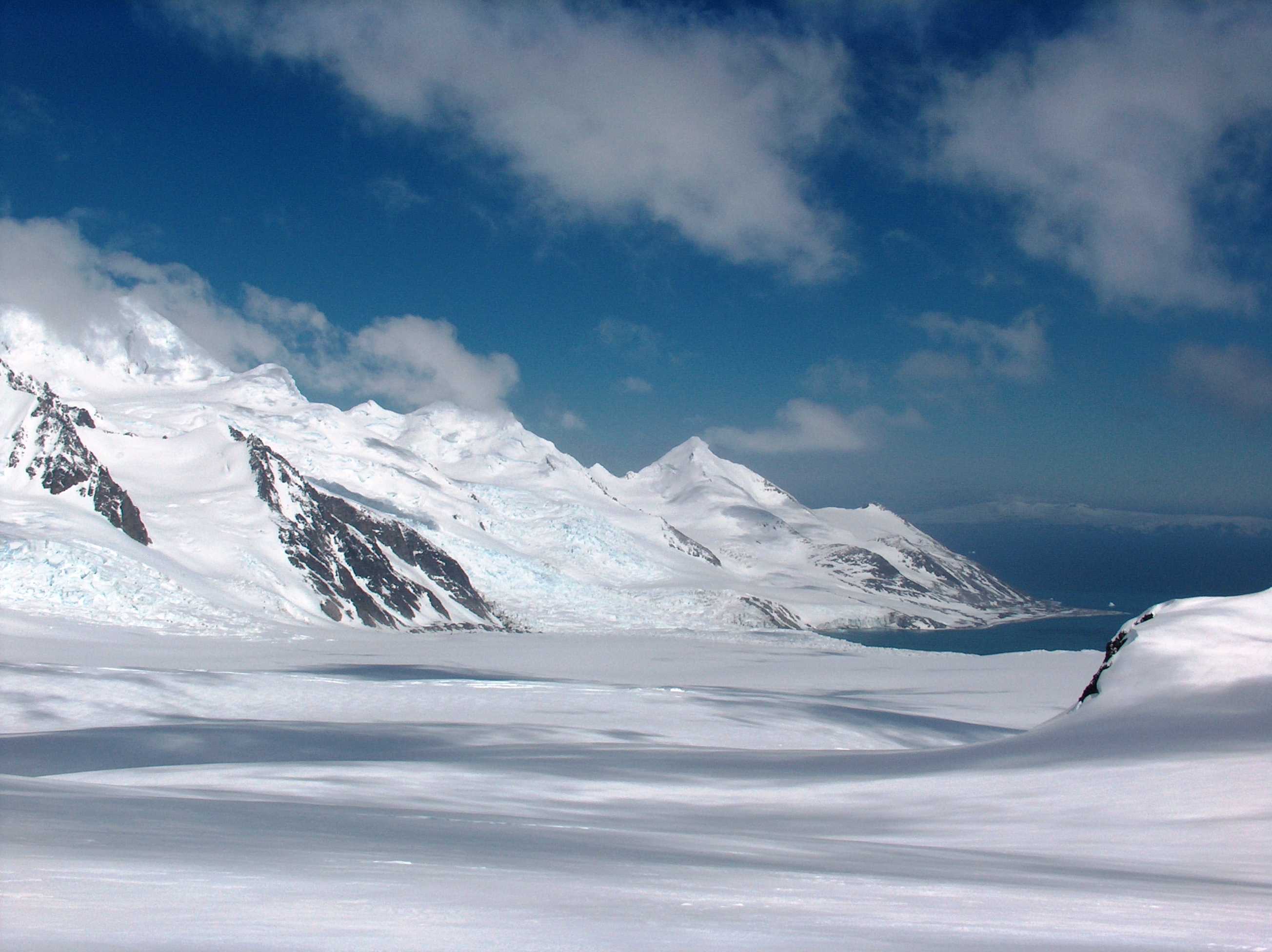
Huntress Glacier from Willan Saddle.

Topographic map of Livingston Island and Smith Island.

Huntress Glacier is a glacier 7 kilometres (4.3 mi) long and 3.7 kilometres (2.3 mi) wide flowing into the head of False Bay, Livingston Island in the South Shetland Islands, Antarctica. It is situated east of Johnsons Glacier, southeast of Contell Glacier and Balkan Snowfield, south of upper Perunika Glacier, southwest of Huron Glacier and northwest of Macy Glacier, and is bounded by Friesland Ridge and the Tangra Mountains to the southeast, Nesebar Gap, Pliska Ridge, Burdick Ridge and Willan Nunatak to the north, and Charrúa Gap and Napier Peak to the northwest.

The glacier was named by the UK Antarctic Place-Names Committee in 1958 after the American schooner Huntress (Captain Christopher Burdick) from Nantucket, which visited the South Shetland Islands in 1820–21 in company with the Huron of New Haven, Connecticut.

== Location ==
The glacier's midpoint is located at 62°40′00″S 60°15′45″W (British mapping in 1968, and Bulgarian in 2005 and 2009).

== See also ==
- List of glaciers in the Antarctic
- Glaciology

== Maps ==
- L.L. Ivanov et al. Antarctica: Livingston Island and Greenwich Island, South Shetland Islands. Scale 1:100000 topographic map. Sofia: Antarctic Place-names Commission of Bulgaria, 2005.
- L.L. Ivanov. Antarctica: Livingston Island and Greenwich, Robert, Snow and Smith Islands. Scale 1:120000 topographic map. Troyan: Manfred Wörner Foundation, 2009. ISBN 978-954-92032-6-4
- L.L. Ivanov. Antarctica: Livingston Island and Smith Island. Scale 1:100000 topographic map. Manfred Wörner Foundation, 2017. ISBN 978-619-90008-3-0
- A. Kamburov and L. Ivanov. Bowles Ridge and Central Tangra Mountains: Livingston Island, Antarctica. Scale 1:25000 map. Sofia: Manfred Wörner Foundation, 2023. ISBN 978-619-90008-6-1
