= Charrúa Gap =

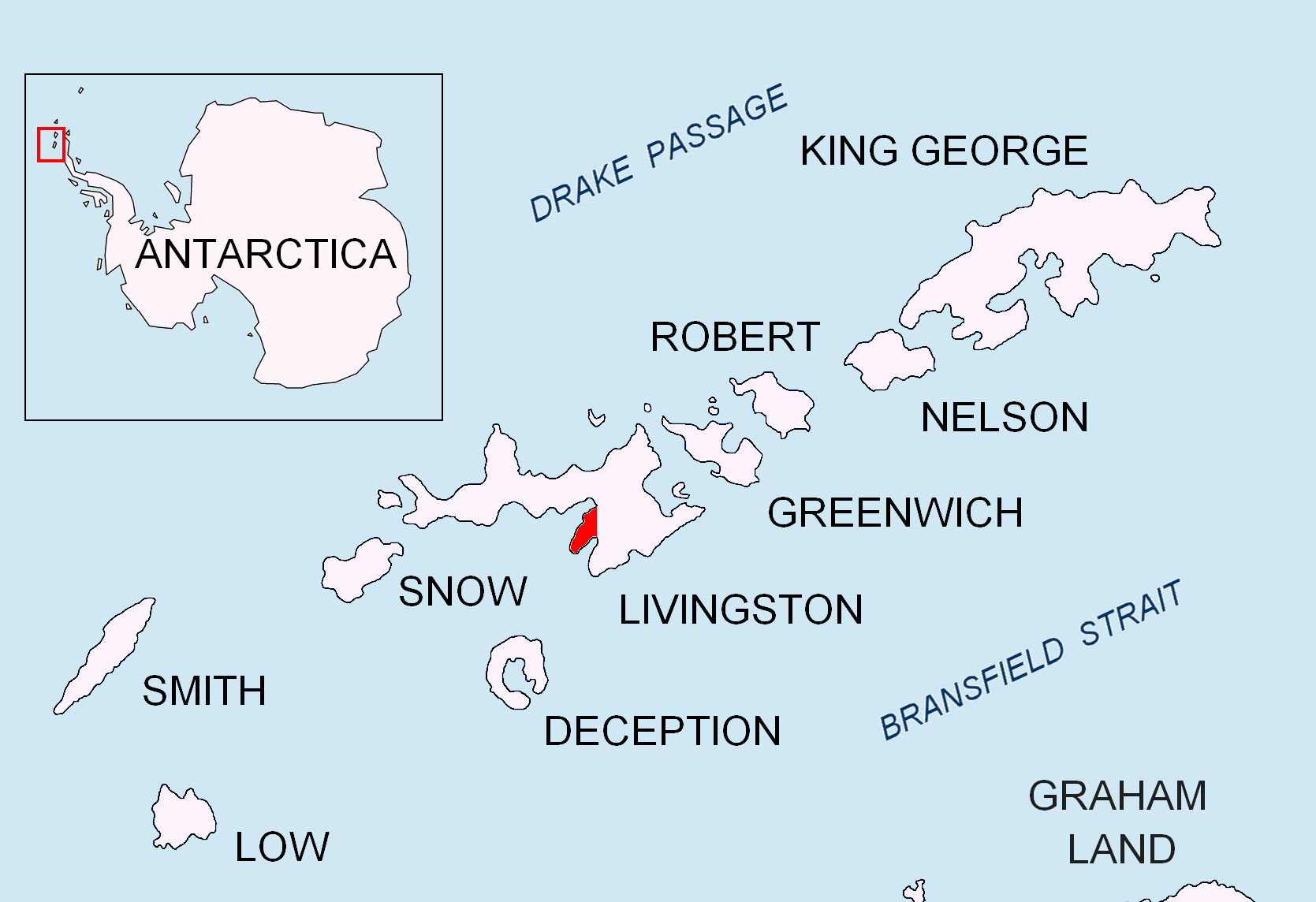
Location of Hurd Peninsula in the South Shetland Islands

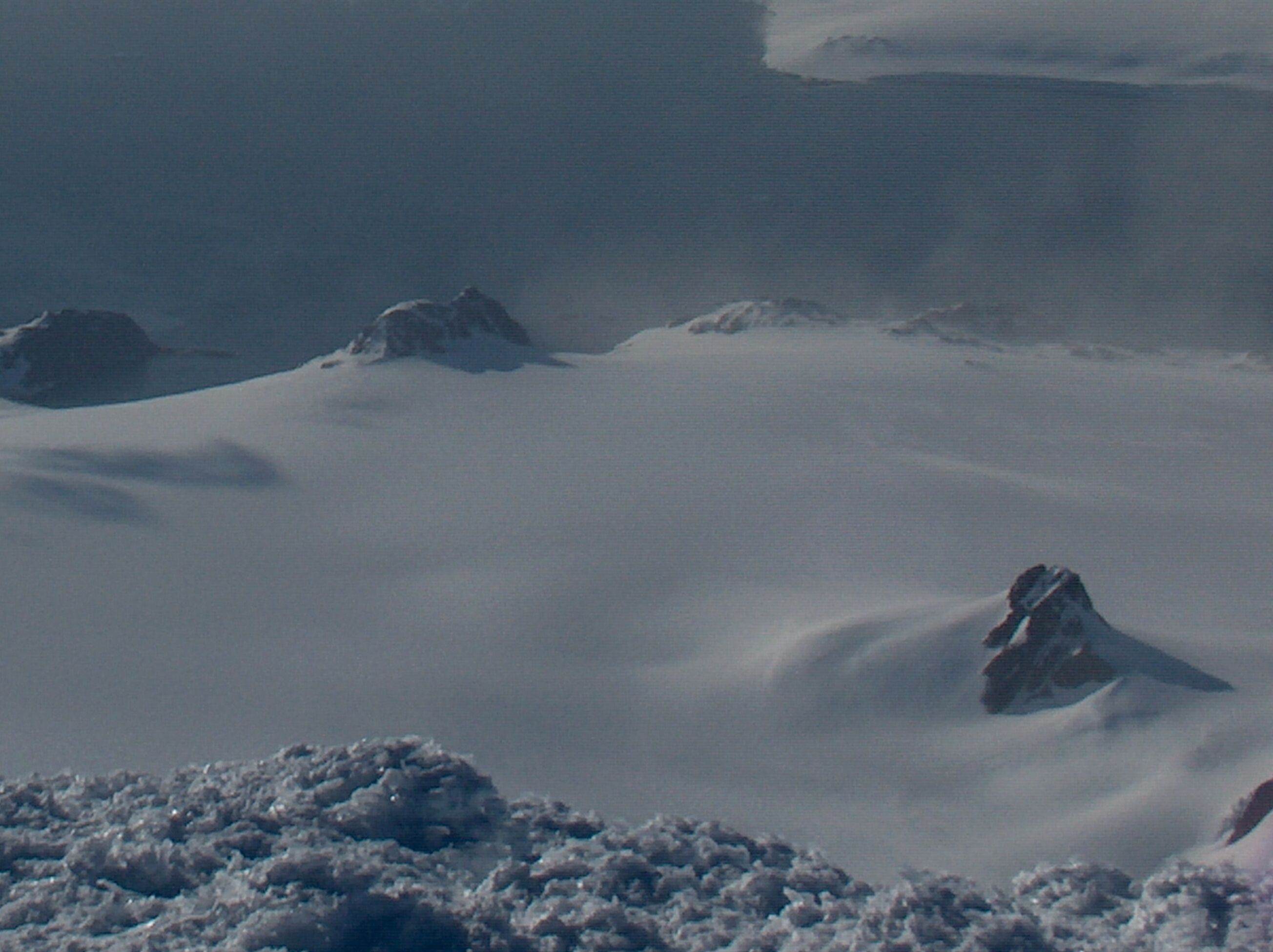
Charrúa Gap from Mount Friesland

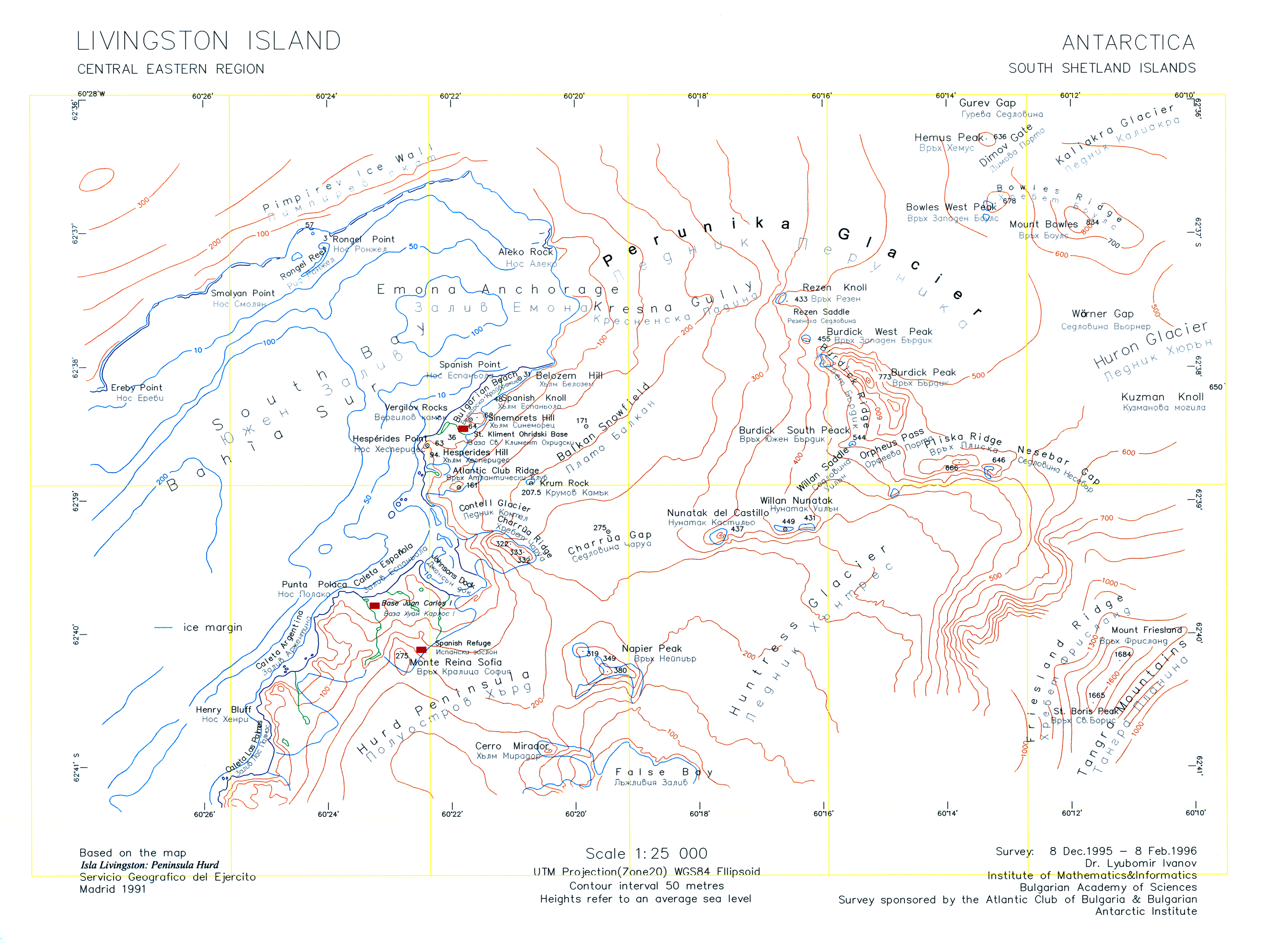
Topographic map of central-eastern Livingston Island featuring Charrúa Gap

Topographic map of Livingston Island and Smith Island

Charrúa Gap (Sedlovina Charrúa \se-dlo-vi-'na cha-'ru-a\) is a flat ice-covered saddle extending 2.2 kilometres (1.4 mi) in east-west direction between Castillo Nunatak and Charrúa Ridge on Hurd Peninsula, eastern Livingston Island at an elevation of 275 metres (902 ft).

The gap separates the glacial catchments of Balkan Snowfield and Contell Glacier to the north and Huntress Glacier and Johnsons Glacier. The glacial catchments of the last two glaciers are separated by a nameless ice-covered saddle extending 1.5 kilometres (0.93 mi) between the midpoint of Charrúa Gap to the north and Napier Peak (380 metres (1,250 ft)) to the south. A small nameless lake is ice-dammed in a deep hollow to the east of Charrúa Ridge. The feature takes its name from the adjacent Charrúa Ridge.

The Charrúa Gap is part of several overland routes, for example between the Bulgarian base and the Spanish base, from the Bulgarian base to the southern region of Hurd Peninsula and from the Spanish base to Burdick Ridge, Friesland Ridge and Bowles Ridge areas.

The gap was mapped by the UK Directorate of Overseas Surveys in 1968 and a detailed mapping was made by the Spanish Servicio Geográfico del Ejército in 1991. Co-ordinates, elevation and distances given according to a 1995–96 Bulgarian topographic survey.

== Location ==
The midpoint of Charrúa Gap is located at 62°39′18″S 60°19′29″W which is 2.5 kilometres (1.6 mi) southeast of Sinemorets Hill and 3.35 kilometres (2.08 mi) east by northeast of Mount Reina Sofía (275 metres (902 ft)).

== Maps ==
- Isla Livingston: Península Hurd. Mapa topográfico de escala 1:25000. Madrid: Servicio Geográfico del Ejército, 1991. (Map reproduced on p. 16 of the linked work)
- L.L. Ivanov et al. Antarctica: Livingston Island and Greenwich Island, South Shetland Islands. Scale 1:100000 topographic map. Sofia: Antarctic Place-names Commission of Bulgaria, 2005.
- L.L. Ivanov. Antarctica: Livingston Island and Greenwich, Robert, Snow and Smith Islands. Scale 1:120000 topographic map. Troyan: Manfred Wörner Foundation, 2009. ISBN 978-954-92032-6-4
- Antarctic Digital Database (ADD). Scale 1:250000 topographic map of Antarctica. Scientific Committee on Antarctic Research (SCAR). Since 1993, regularly upgraded and updated.
- L.L. Ivanov. Antarctica: Livingston Island and Smith Island. Scale 1:100000 topographic map. Manfred Wörner Foundation, 2017. ISBN 978-619-90008-3-0
