= Charrúa Ridge =

Feature in the South Shetland Islands, Antarctica

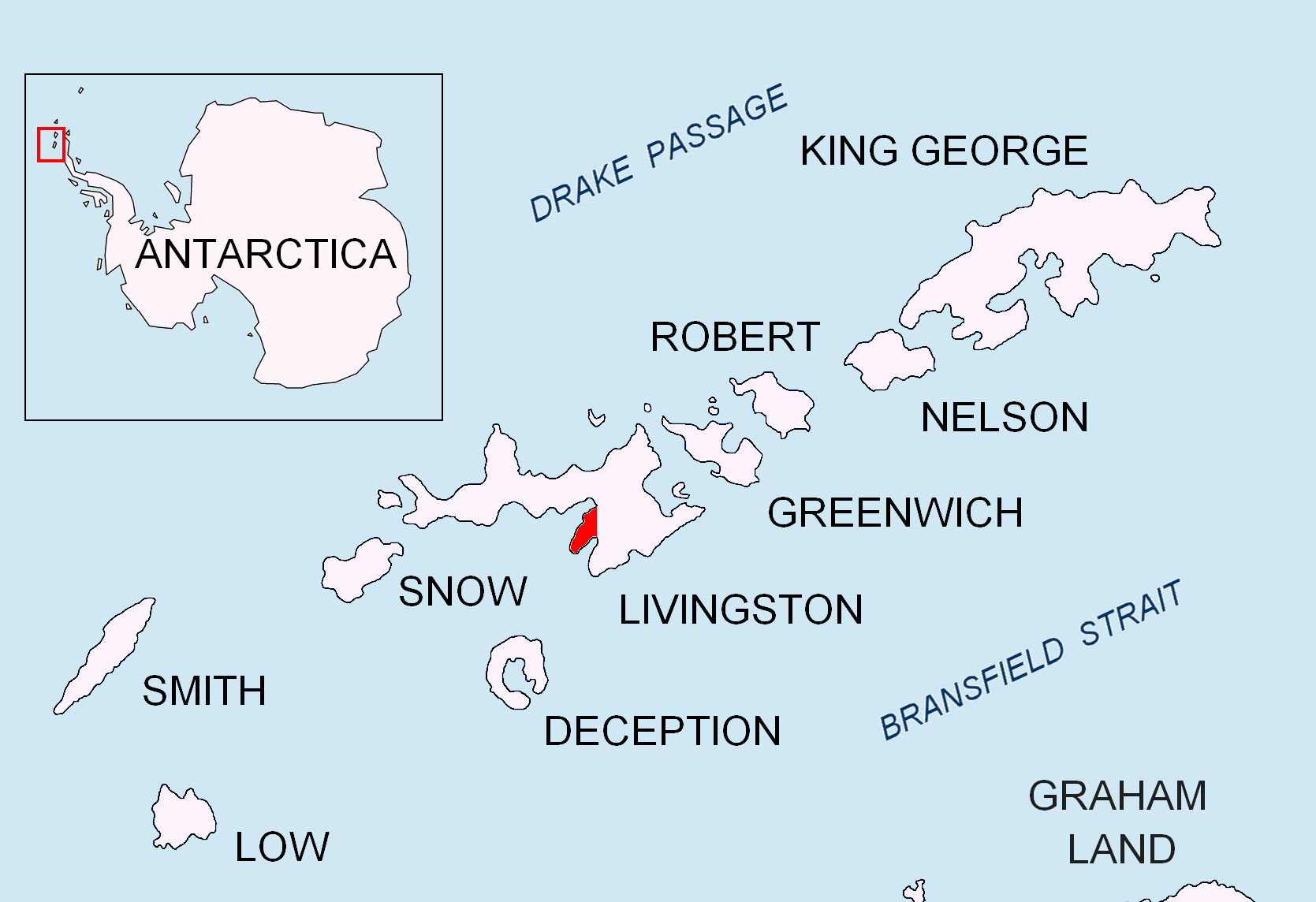
Location of Hurd Peninsula on Livingston Island in the South Shetland Islands.

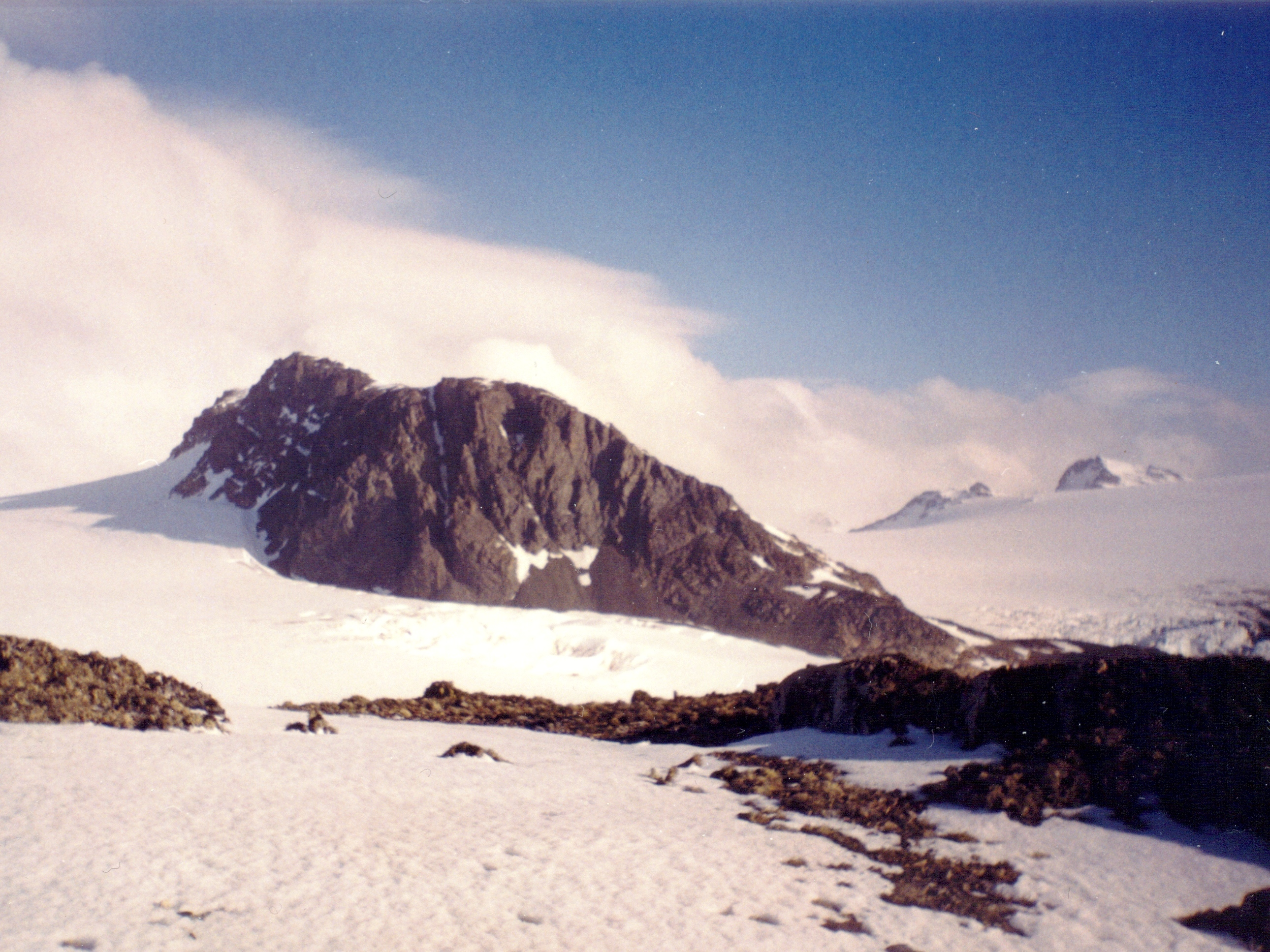
Charrua Ridge from Atlantic Club Ridge, with Contell Glacier to the left, and Johnsons Glacier, Napier Peak and Moores Peak to the right.

Topographic map of Livingston Island and Smith Island.

Charrúa Ridge is an ice-free rocky ridge rising to 333 metres (1,093 ft) along the northeast coast of Johnsons Dock in Hurd Peninsula, Livingston Island, in the South Shetland Islands, Antarctica. It is narrow and precipitous, extending 700 metres (800 yd) in a west-northwest to east-southeast direction, with triple heights of elevation 322, 333 and 332 m respectively, and linked to Castillo Nunatak by Charrúa Gap. It surmounts Contell Glacier to the north, South Bay to the west, Johnsons Dock to the southwest and Johnsons Glacier to the south. It forms a prominent landmark in the area between the Spanish Antarctic base Juan Carlos I and the Bulgarian Antarctic base St. Kliment Ohridski.

The feature is named after the Charrúa, one of the ships of the Argentine Antarctic Expedition of 1947–48, and the name "Monte Charrúa" appears for this feature on a 1954 Argentine navy chart.

== Location ==
The summit of the ridge is located at 62°39′23″S 60°20′54″W which is 1.9 kilometres (1.2 mi) southeast of Hespérides Point, 950 metres (0.6 mi) south by west of Krum Rock, 2.9 kilometres (1.8 mi) west of Castillo Nunatak and 2.05 kilometres (1.27 mi) northwest of Napier Peak. (Detailed Spanish mapping in 1991, and Bulgarian in 1996, 2005 and 2009).

== Maps ==
- Isla Livingston: Península Hurd. Mapa topográfico de escala 1:25000. Madrid: Servicio Geográfico del Ejército, 1991. (Map reproduced on p. 16 of the linked work)
- L.L. Ivanov. Livingston Island: Central-Eastern Region. Scale 1:25000 topographic map. Sofia: Antarctic Place-names Commission of Bulgaria, 1996.
- L.L. Ivanov et al. Antarctica: Livingston Island and Greenwich Island, South Shetland Islands. Scale 1:100000 topographic map. Sofia: Antarctic Place-names Commission of Bulgaria, 2005.
- L.L. Ivanov. Antarctica: Livingston Island and Greenwich, Robert, Snow and Smith Islands. Scale 1:120000 topographic map. Troyan: Manfred Wörner Foundation, 2009. ISBN 978-954-92032-6-4
- Antarctic Digital Database (ADD). Scale 1:250000 topographic map of Antarctica. Scientific Committee on Antarctic Research (SCAR). Since 1993, regularly upgraded and updated.
- L.L. Ivanov. Antarctica: Livingston Island and Smith Island. Scale 1:100000 topographic map. Manfred Wörner Foundation, 2017. ISBN 978-619-90008-3-0
