= Mount Reina Sofía =

Peak on Livingston Island, Antarctica

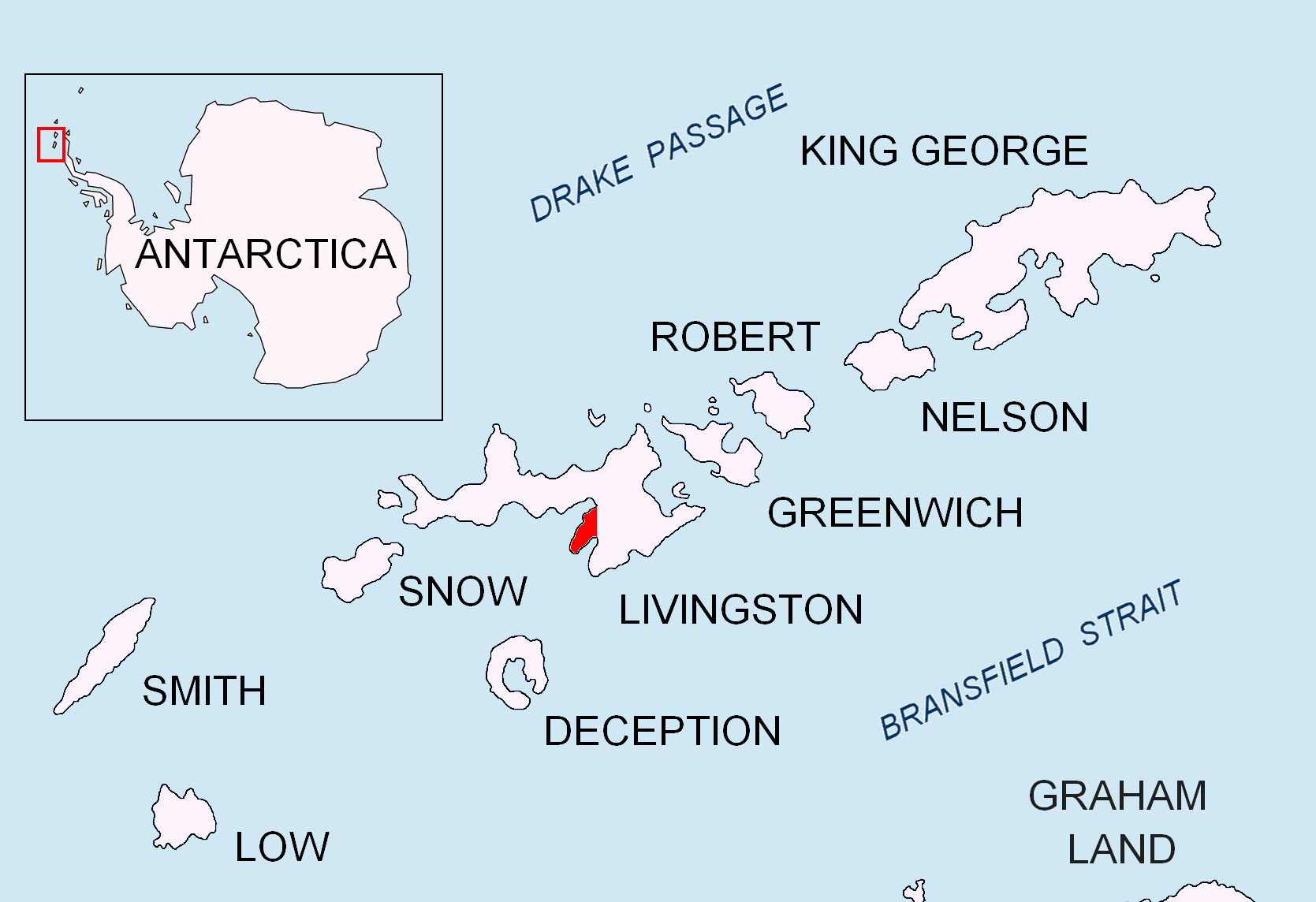
Location of Hurd Peninsula in the South Shetland Islands.

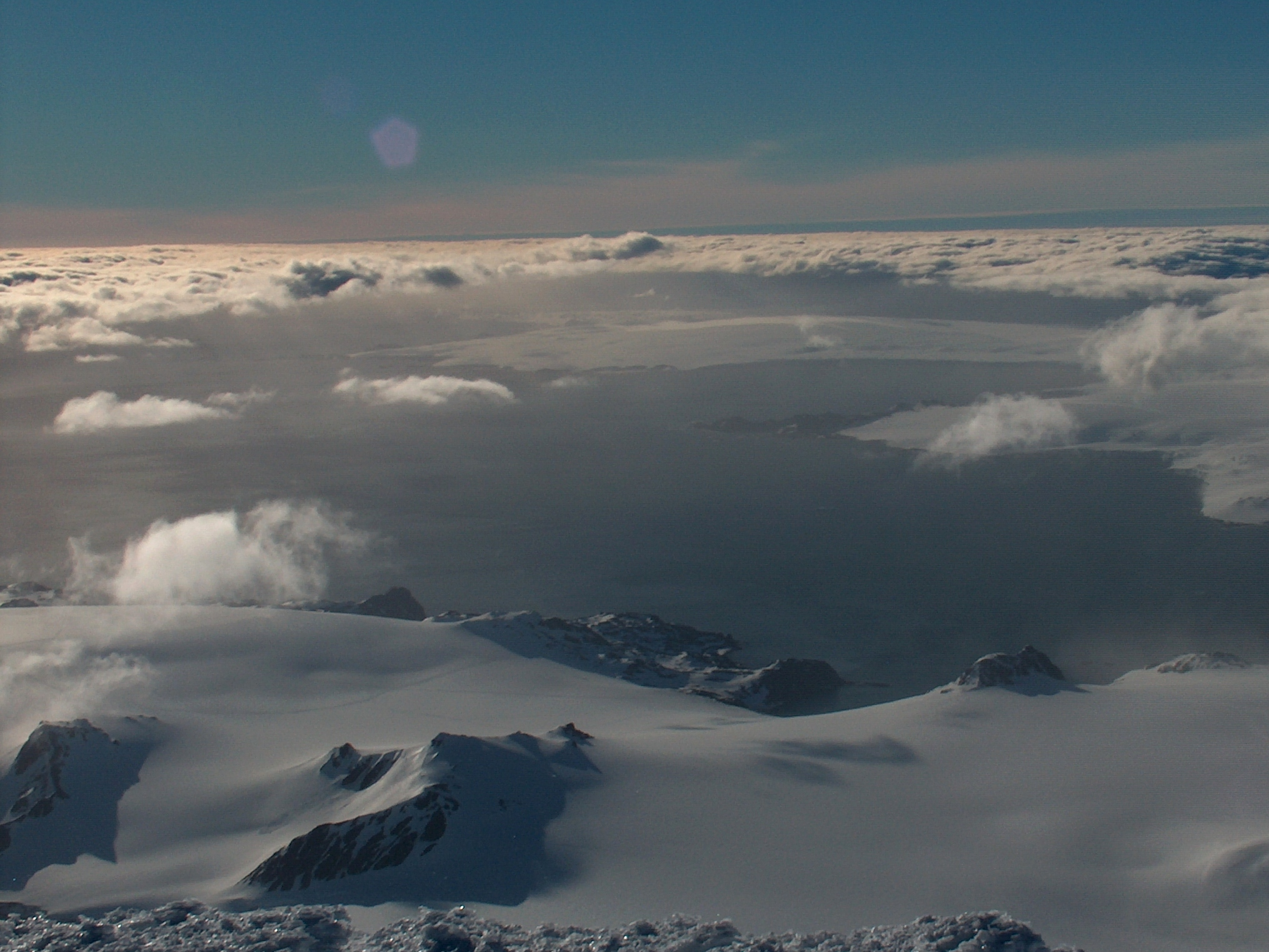
Mount Reina Sofía (the partly ice-covered peak in the background) from Mount Friesland, with Napier Peak in the foreground and Charrúa Ridge on the right.

Topographic map of Livingston Island and Smith Island.

Mount Reina Sofía (Spanish: Monte Reina Sofía) is the mostly ice-free peak rising to 275 m on Hurd Peninsula, Livingston Island in the South Shetland Islands, Antarctica and surmounting Johnsons Glacier to the east and northeast, and the Spanish Antarctic base Juan Carlos Primero to the north-northwest.

The feature is named after Queen Sofía of Spain.

== Location ==
The peak is located at 62°40′11″S 60°22′45″W which is 1.3 km south by west of Ballester Point, 2.24 km southwest of Charrúa Ridge, 2.85 km west of Napier Peak, 2.8 km northwest of Moores Peak and 800 m south-southeast of the Spanish base (detailed Spanish mapping in 1991, and Bulgarian mapping in 1996, 2005 and 2009).

== Maps ==
- Isla Livingston: Península Hurd. Mapa topográfico de escala 1:25000. Madrid: Servicio Geográfico del Ejército, 1991. (Map reproduced on p. 16 of the linked work)
- L.L. Ivanov. Livingston Island: Central-Eastern Region. Scale 1:25000 topographic map. Sofia: Antarctic Place-names Commission of Bulgaria, 1996.
- L.L. Ivanov et al. Antarctica: Livingston Island and Greenwich Island, South Shetland Islands. Scale 1:100000 topographic map. Sofia: Antarctic Place-names Commission of Bulgaria, 2005.
- L.L. Ivanov. Antarctica: Livingston Island and Greenwich, Robert, Snow and Smith Islands. Scale 1:120000 topographic map. Troyan: Manfred Wörner Foundation, 2009. ISBN 978-954-92032-6-4
- Antarctic Digital Database (ADD). Scale 1:250000 topographic map of Antarctica. Scientific Committee on Antarctic Research (SCAR). Since 1993, regularly upgraded and updated.
- L.L. Ivanov. Antarctica: Livingston Island and Smith Island. Scale 1:100000 topographic map. Manfred Wörner Foundation, 2017. ISBN 978-619-90008-3-0
