= Castillo Nunatak =

Rocky peak in the South Shetland Islands, Antarctica

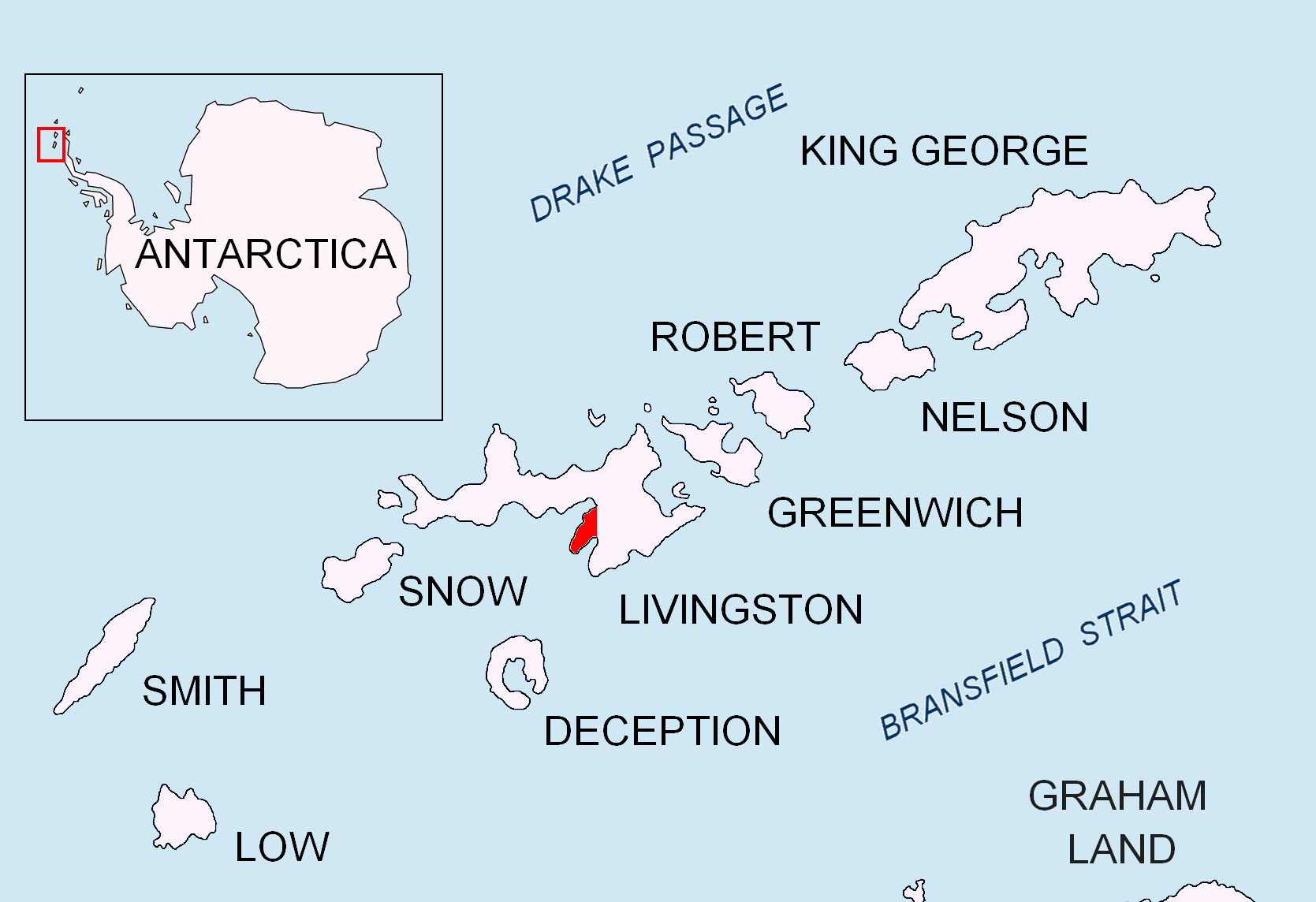
Location of Hurd Peninsula in the South Shetland Islands

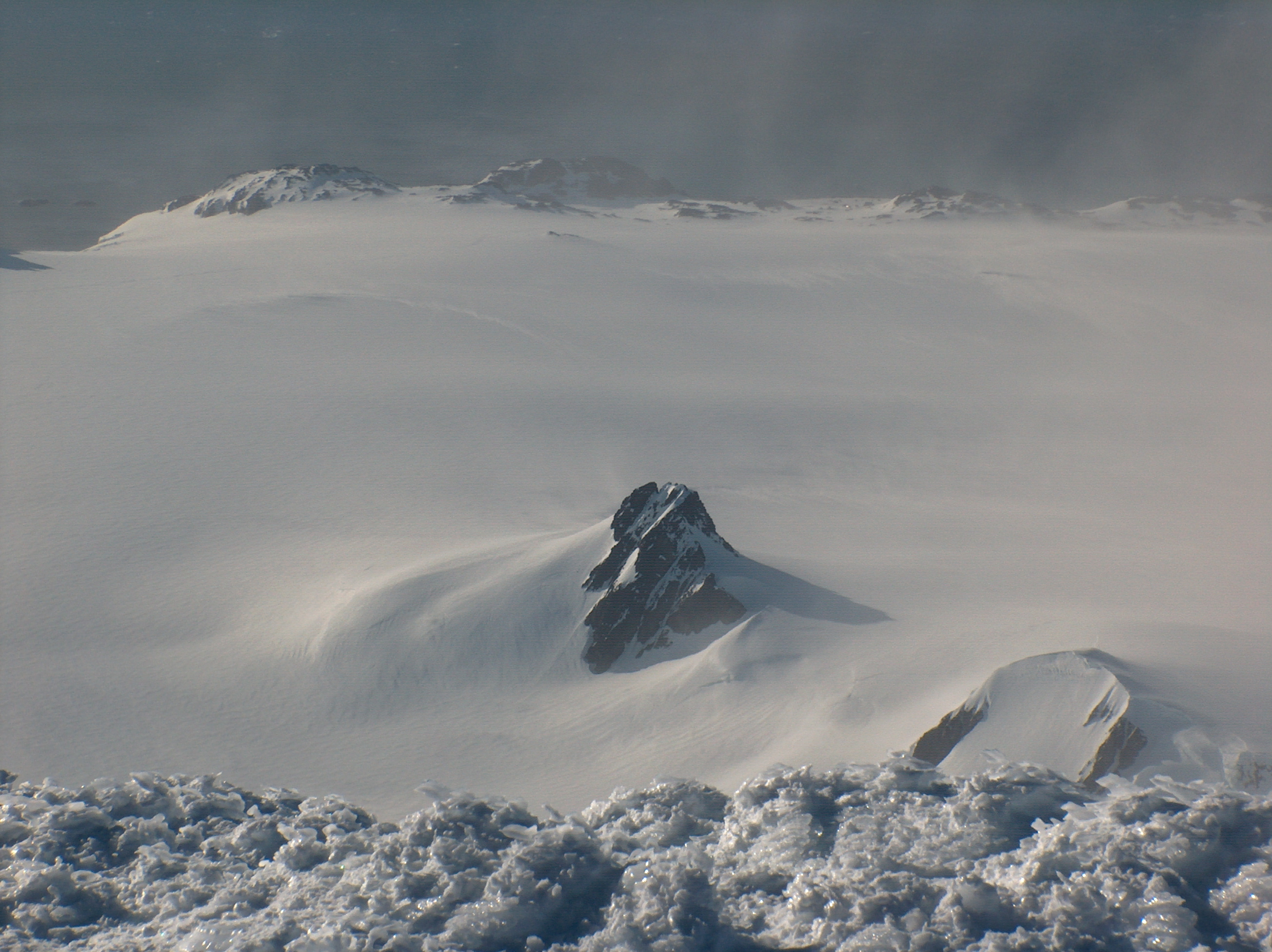
Castillo Nunatak from Mount Friesland

Topographic map of Livingston Island and Smith Island

Castillo Nunatak is a conspicuous rocky peak rising to 437 m on the glacial divide between Huntress Glacier and Balkan Snowfield on Hurd Peninsula in eastern Livingston Island in the South Shetland Islands, Antarctica. It is linked to Charrúa Ridge to the west Charrúa Gap and, via Willan Nunatak and Willan Saddle, to Burdick Ridge to the east-northeast. Castillo Nunatak is a prominent landmark in the Charrúa Gap area.

The feature is descriptively named for its abrupt and isolated appearance ('Castle Nunatak' in Spanish).

== Location ==
The peak is located at 62°39′16.7″S 60°17′34″W which is 860 m west of Willan Nunatak, 2.5 km northeast of Napier Peak, 2,9 km east of Charrúa Ridge and 2.8 km east-southeast of Krum Rock. Detailed Spanish mapping in 1991, and Bulgarian mapping in 1996, 2005 and 2009.

== Maps ==
- Isla Livingston: Península Hurd. Mapa topográfico de escala 1:25000. Madrid: Servicio Geográfico del Ejército, 1991. (Map reproduced on p. 16 of the linked work)
- L.L. Ivanov. Livingston Island: Central-Eastern Region. Scale 1:25000 topographic map. Sofia: Antarctic Place-names Commission of Bulgaria, 1996.
- L.L. Ivanov et al. Antarctica: Livingston Island and Greenwich Island, South Shetland Islands. Scale 1:100000 topographic map. Sofia: Antarctic Place-names Commission of Bulgaria, 2005.
- L.L. Ivanov. Antarctica: Livingston Island and Greenwich, Robert, Snow and Smith Islands. Scale 1:120000 topographic map. Troyan: Manfred Wörner Foundation, 2009. ISBN 978-954-92032-6-4
- Antarctic Digital Database (ADD). Scale 1:250000 topographic map of Antarctica. Scientific Committee on Antarctic Research (SCAR). Since 1993, regularly upgraded and updated.
- L.L. Ivanov. Antarctica: Livingston Island and Smith Island. Scale 1:100000 topographic map. Manfred Wörner Foundation, 2017. ISBN 978-619-90008-3-0
