= Reina Sofia =

Reina Sofia (Queen Sophia) may refer to:

- Queen Sofía of Spain
- Mount Reina Sofía
- Museo Nacional Centro de Arte Reina Sofía, Madrid
- Spanish frigate Reina Sofía
- Tenerife South Airport, or Tenerife South–Reina Sofía Airport
