= Krum Rock =

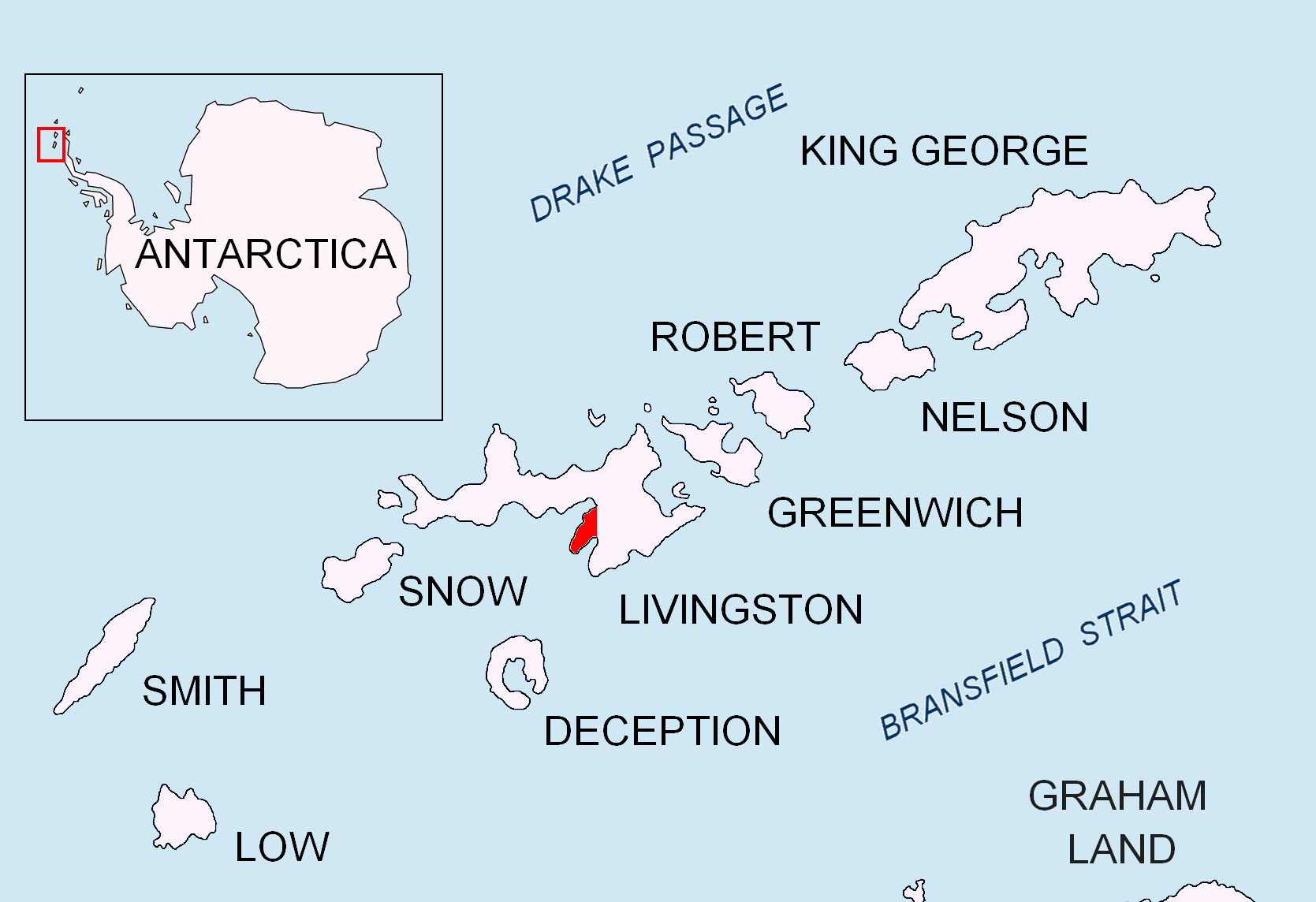
Location of Hurd Peninsula on Livingston Island in the South Shetland Islands.

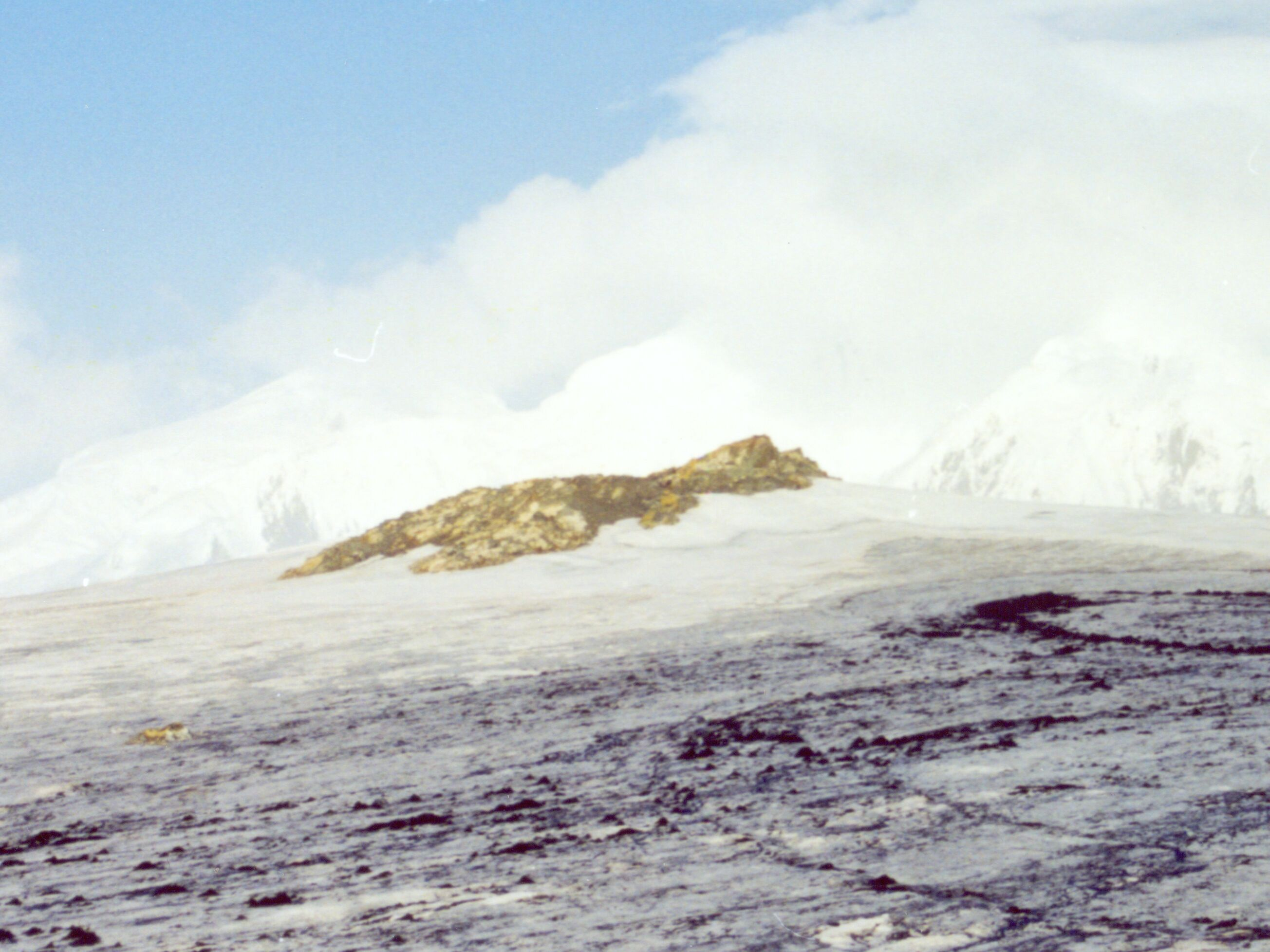
Krum Rock, with Tangra Mountains in the background.

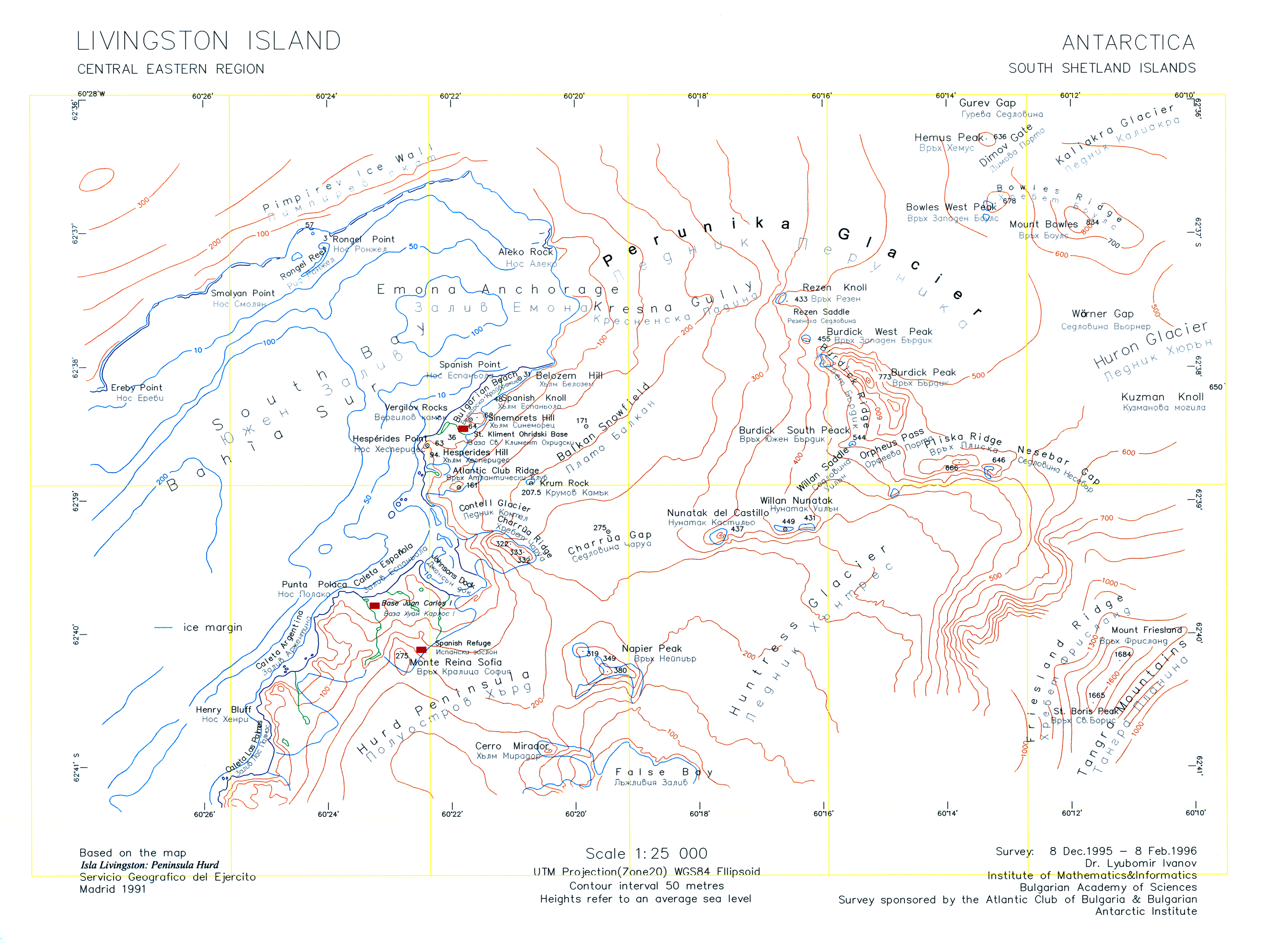
Topographic map of central-eastern Livingston Island featuring Krum Rock.

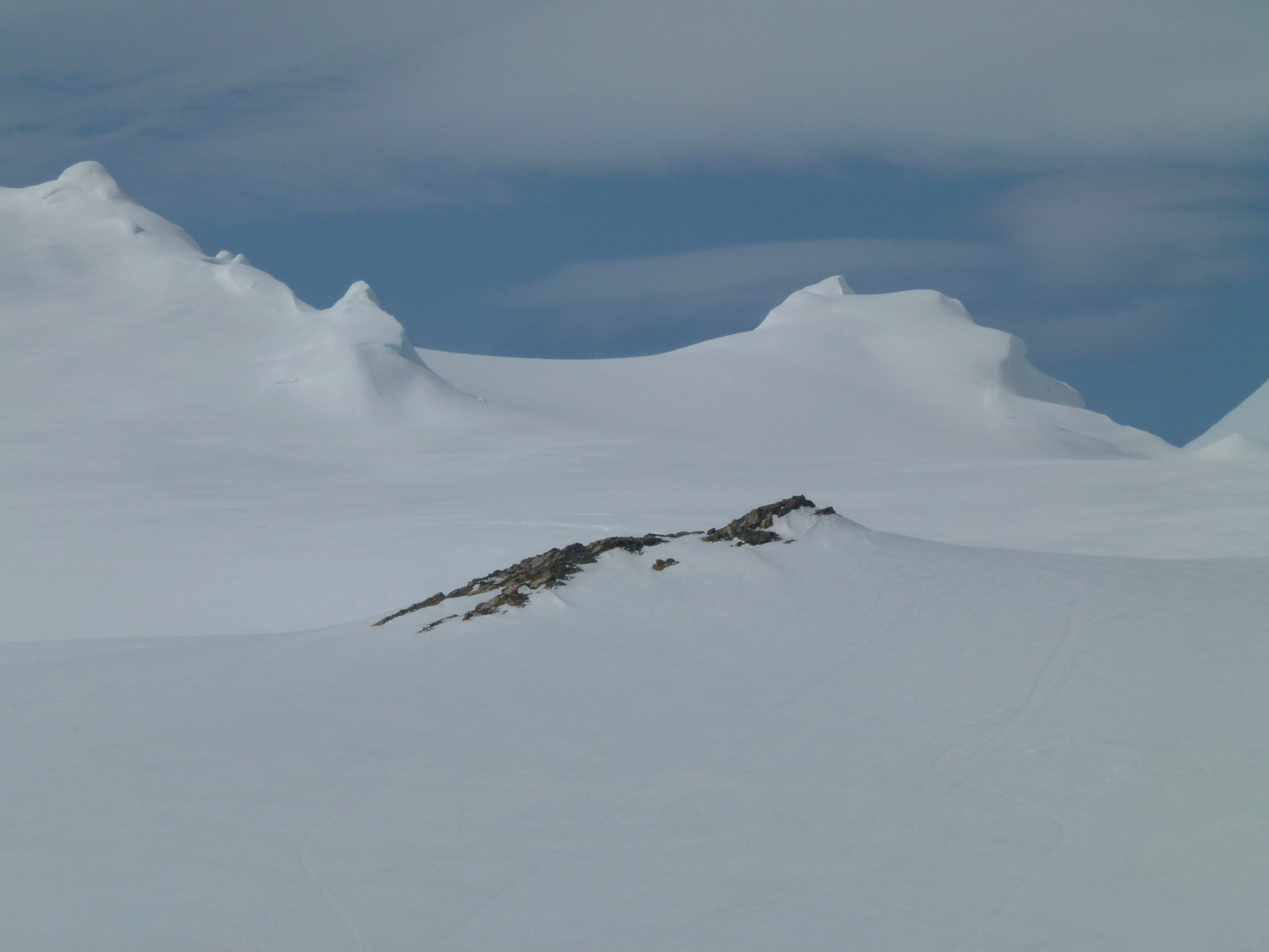
Krum Rock, with Orpheus Gate in the background.

Topographic map of Livingston Island and Smith Island

Krum Rock (Bulgarian: Krumov Kamak \'kru-mov 'ka-m&k\) is a small nunatak rising to 208 metres on the southwest edge of Balkan Snowfield just north of Contell Glacier on Hurd Peninsula in eastern Livingston Island, one of the South Shetland Islands in Western Antarctica. The rock projects slightly above the ice sheet with some 3,000 square metres of rocky ground exposed on its northern slope in summer. Because of its location rather than prominence, it is a particularly important landmark in the course of field work carried out in the area.

== Location ==
The nunatak is located at 62°38′53.1″S 60°20′43.4″W which is 1 km east of Atlantic Club Ridge, 1.2 km southeast of Sinemorets Hill, 2.8 km west by north of Castillo Nunatak, and 1 km north by east of the highest point of Charrúa Ridge.

Krum Rock is named for Krum Velchev, meteorologist at St. Kliment Ohridski Base for several seasons since 1993. The name form Krumov Kamak was well established in use at the time of approval.

== Maps ==
- Isla Livingston: Península Hurd. Mapa topográfico de escala 1:25000. Madrid: Servicio Geográfico del Ejército, 1991. (Map reproduced on p. 16 of the linked work)
- L.L. Ivanov. Livingston Island: Central-Eastern Region. Scale 1:25000 topographic map. Sofia: Antarctic Place-names Commission of Bulgaria, 1996.
- L.L. Ivanov et al. Antarctica: Livingston Island and Greenwich Island, South Shetland Islands. Scale 1:100000 topographic map. Sofia: Antarctic Place-names Commission of Bulgaria, 2005.
- L.L. Ivanov. Antarctica: Livingston Island and Greenwich, Robert, Snow and Smith Islands. Scale 1:120000 topographic map. Troyan: Manfred Wörner Foundation, 2009. ISBN 978-954-92032-6-4
- Antarctic Digital Database (ADD). Scale 1:250000 topographic map of Antarctica. Scientific Committee on Antarctic Research (SCAR). Since 1993, regularly upgraded and updated.
- L.L. Ivanov. Antarctica: Livingston Island and Smith Island. Scale 1:100000 topographic map. Manfred Wörner Foundation, 2017. ISBN 978-619-90008-3-0

== Honours ==
Krumov Kamak Street in the city of Sofia is named after the feature.
