= Juan Carlos I Antarctic Base =

Juan Carlos I Station Base Antártica Española Juan Carlos I
- Antarctic base
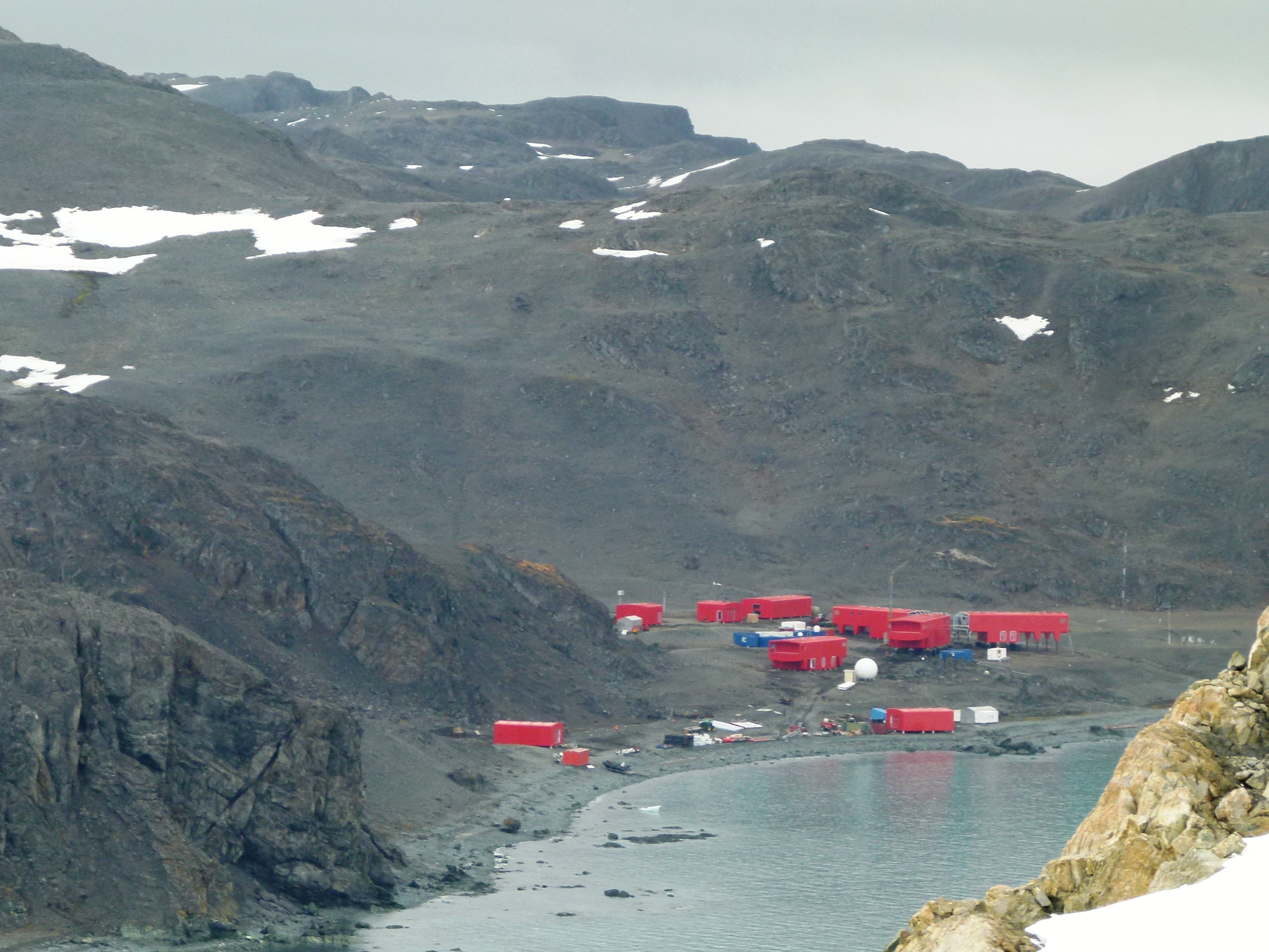
- The all-new facilities of Juan Carlos I Base in 2011.

- Seal

- Location of Juan Carlos I Station in Antarctica
- Coordinates: 62°39′47″S 60°23′17″W
- Country: Spain
- Location in Antarctica: Hurd Peninsula; Livingston Island; South Shetland Islands
- Administered by: Spanish National Research Council
- Established: 8 January 1988
- Named after: Juan Carlos I
- Elevation: 12 m (39 ft)

Population (2017)
  - Summer: 27
  - Winter: 0
- UN/LOCODE: AQ JCP
- Type: Seasonal
- Period: Summer
- Status: Operational
- Activities: List: Climatology; Geocryology; Geodesy; Geomorphology; Glaciology; Limnology; Hydrology
- Website: Consejo Superior de Investigaciones Científicas (CSIC)

Juan Carlos I Antarctic Base, named after the former king of Spain, Juan Carlos I (Spanish: Base Antártica Española Juan Carlos I), is a seasonal (November to March) scientific station operated by Spain, opened in January 1988. Situated on Hurd Peninsula, Livingston Island in the South Shetland Islands, Antarctica.

The base is controlled by the Marine Technology Unit of the Spanish National Research Council and is 20 miles away from the Spanish Antarctic base Gabriel de Castilla.

The base has undergone several renovations, the closest remodeling was completed in 2018 and it was inaugurated by the Science Minister, Pedro Duque, on February 2, 2019. This latest renovation involved the construction of "new facilities [that] have allowed it to double its capacity, up to 51 people, and increase the space available for scientific and technical personnel in laboratories."

== Location ==
The base is on the coast of Española Cove, South Bay, in the northern foothills of Mount Reina Sofía, and 2.7 km south-southwest of the Bulgarian base St. Kliment Ohridski. The two bases are linked by a 5.5 km overland route via Johnsons Glacier, Charrúa Gap, Contell Glacier and Krum Rock.

== See also ==
- Gabriel de Castilla Base
- List of Antarctic research stations
- List of Antarctic field camps
- Livingston Island
- Camp Byers

== Gallery ==
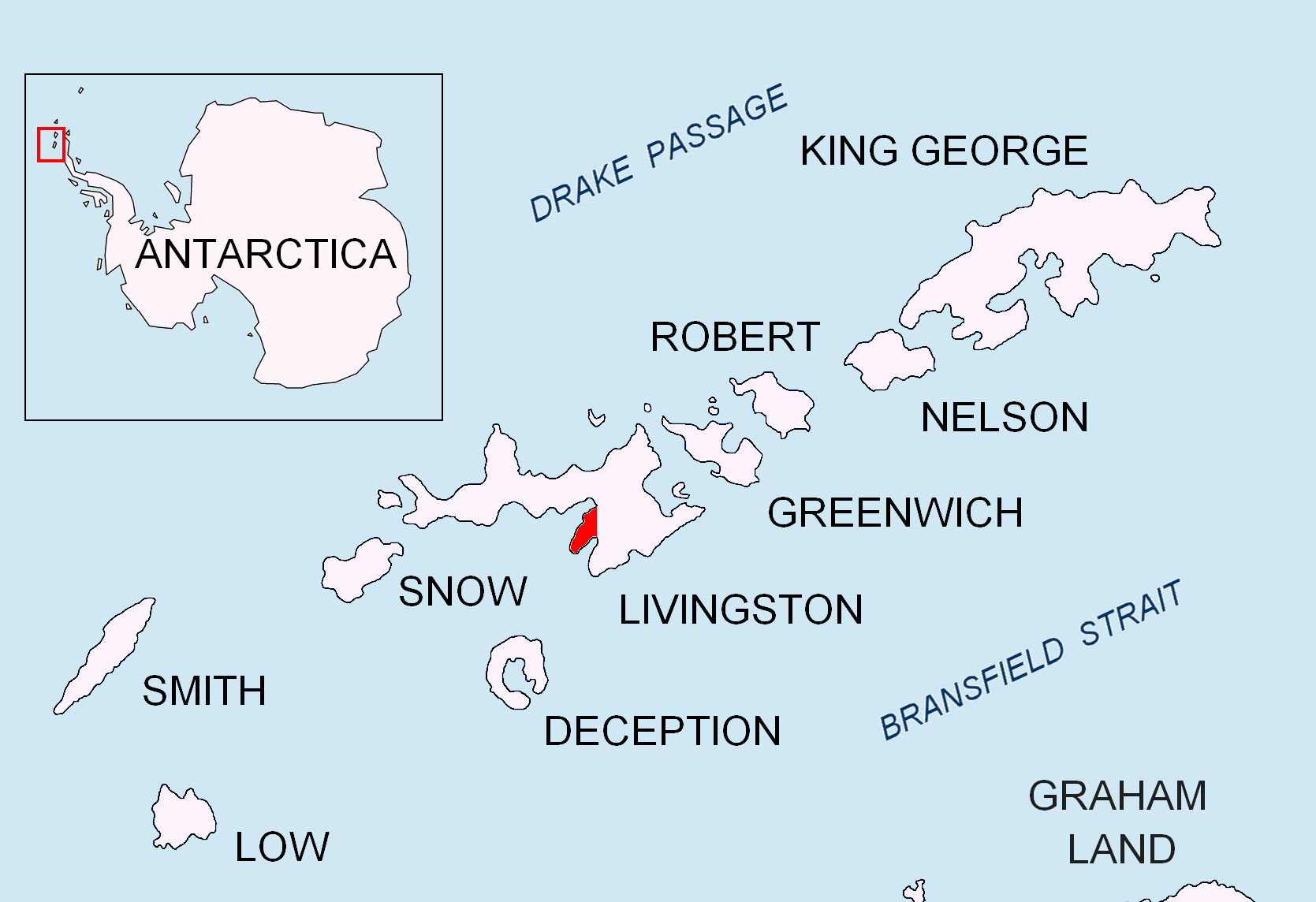
Location of Hurd Peninsula on Livingston Island in the South Shetland Islands.

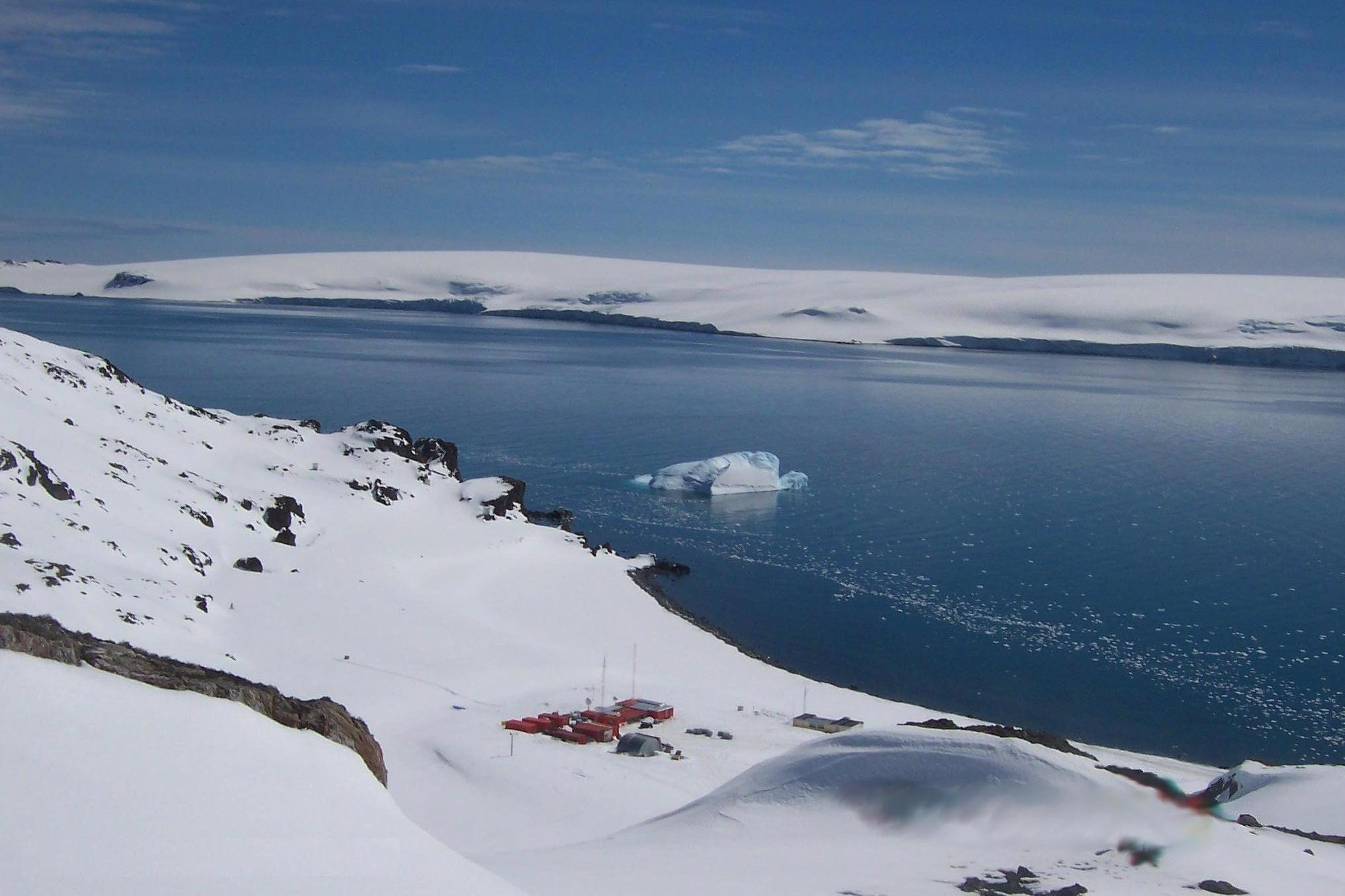
The old Juan Carlos I Base, with South Bay and Ereby Point in the background

Topographic map of Livingston Island with the bases and base camps on the island image

== Maps ==
- Isla Livingston: Península Hurd. Mapa topográfico de escala 1:25000. Madrid: Servicio Geográfico del Ejército, 1991. (Map reproduced on p. 16 of the linked work)
- L .L. Ivanov et al. Antarctica: Livingston Island and Greenwich Island, South Shetland Islands. Scale 1:100000 topographic map. Sofia: Antarctic Place-names Commission of Bulgaria, 2005.
- L. L. Ivanov. Antarctica: Livingston Island and Greenwich, Robert, Snow and Smith Islands. Scale 1:120000 topographic map. Troyan: Manfred Wörner Foundation.
- Antarctic Digital Database (ADD). Scale 1:250000 topographic map of Antarctica. Scientific Committee on Antarctic Research (SCAR). Since 1993, regularly upgraded and updated.
- L.L. Ivanov. Antarctica: Livingston Island and Smith Island. Scale 1:100000 topographic map. Manfred Wörner Foundation, 2017. ISBN 978-619-90008-3-0

== Bibliography ==
- Ivanov, L. General Geography and History of Livingston Island. In: Bulgarian Antarctic Research: A Synthesis. Eds. C. Pimpirev and N. Chipev. Sofia: St. Kliment Ohridski University Press, 2015. pp. 17–28. ISBN 978-954-07-3939-7
