= Mirador Hill =

Rocky hill in the South Shetland Islands, Antarctica

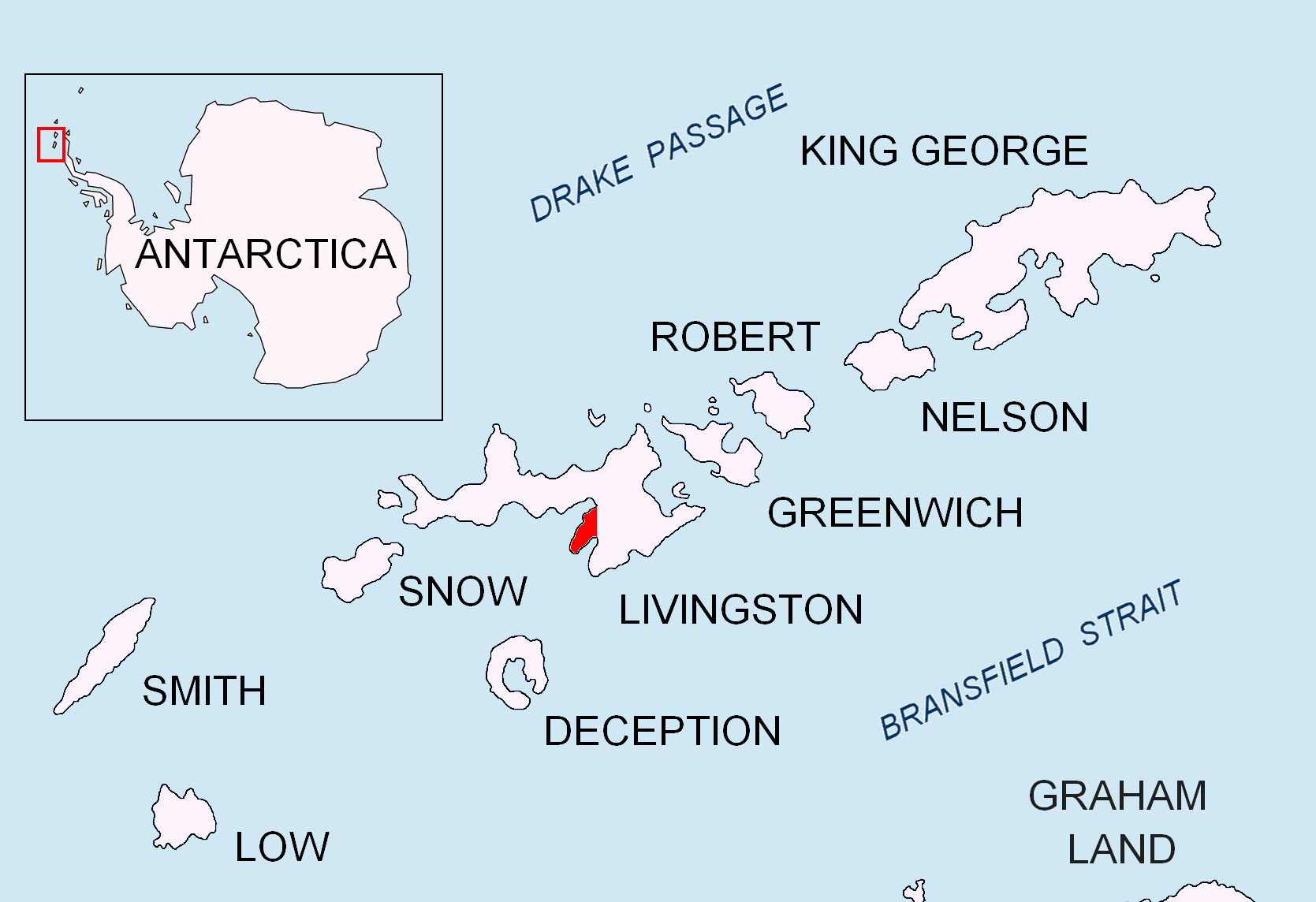
Location of Hurd Peninsula in the South Shetland Islands.

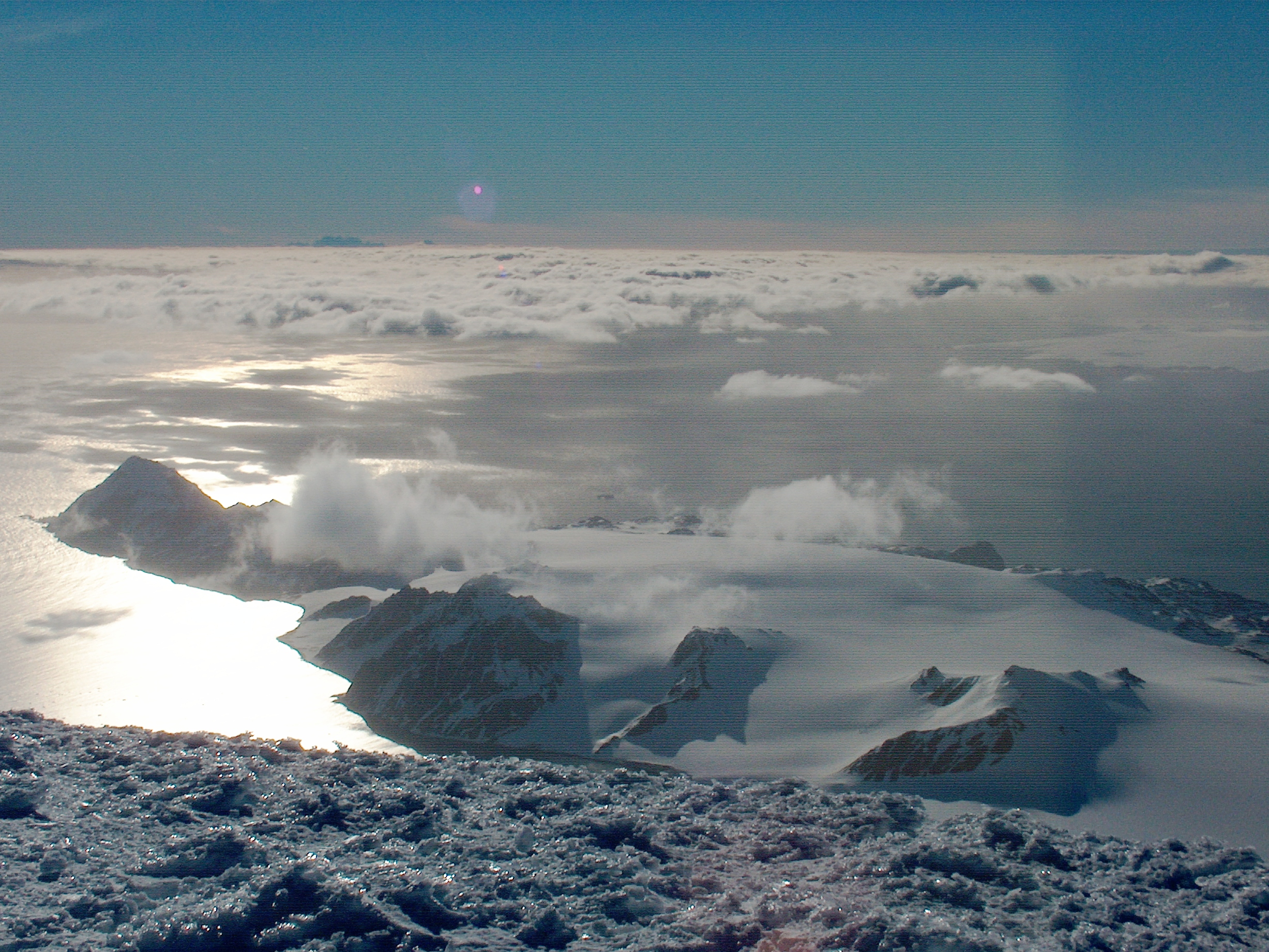
Cerro Mirador (second on the right) from Mount Friesland.

Topographic map of Livingston Island and Smith Island.

Mirador Hill (Spanish: Cerro Mirador, 'Balcony Hill') is the rocky hill rising to 307 m on Hurd Peninsula, Livingston Island in the South Shetland Islands, Antarctica and surmounting Johnsons Glacier to the north-northwest and False Bay to the southeast.

The feature was mapped and descriptively named in 1991 by the Spanish Antarctic Expedition from its excellent view towards False Bay.

== Location ==
The peak is located at 62°40′53.4″S 60°20′23″W which is 1.35 km south-southwest of Napier Peak, 880 m north by east of Moores Peak and 4.49 km west-northwest of Kikish Crag (Spanish mapping in 1991, and Bulgarian in 1996, 2005 and 2009).

== Maps ==
- Isla Livingston: Península Hurd. Mapa topográfico de escala 1:25000. Madrid: Servicio Geográfico del Ejército, 1991. (Map reproduced on p. 16 of the linked work)
- L.L. Ivanov. Livingston Island: Central-Eastern Region. Scale 1:25000 topographic map. Sofia: Antarctic Place-names Commission of Bulgaria, 1996.
- L.L. Ivanov et al. Antarctica: Livingston Island and Greenwich Island, South Shetland Islands. Scale 1:100000 topographic map. Sofia: Antarctic Place-names Commission of Bulgaria, 2005.
- L.L. Ivanov. Antarctica: Livingston Island and Greenwich, Robert, Snow and Smith Islands. Scale 1:120000 topographic map. Troyan: Manfred Wörner Foundation, 2009. ISBN 978-954-92032-6-4
- Antarctic Digital Database (ADD). Scale 1:250000 topographic map of Antarctica. Scientific Committee on Antarctic Research (SCAR). Since 1993, regularly upgraded and updated.
- L.L. Ivanov. Antarctica: Livingston Island and Smith Island. Scale 1:100000 topographic map. Manfred Wörner Foundation, 2017. ISBN 978-619-90008-3-0
