= Johnsons Glacier =

Glacier in Antarctica

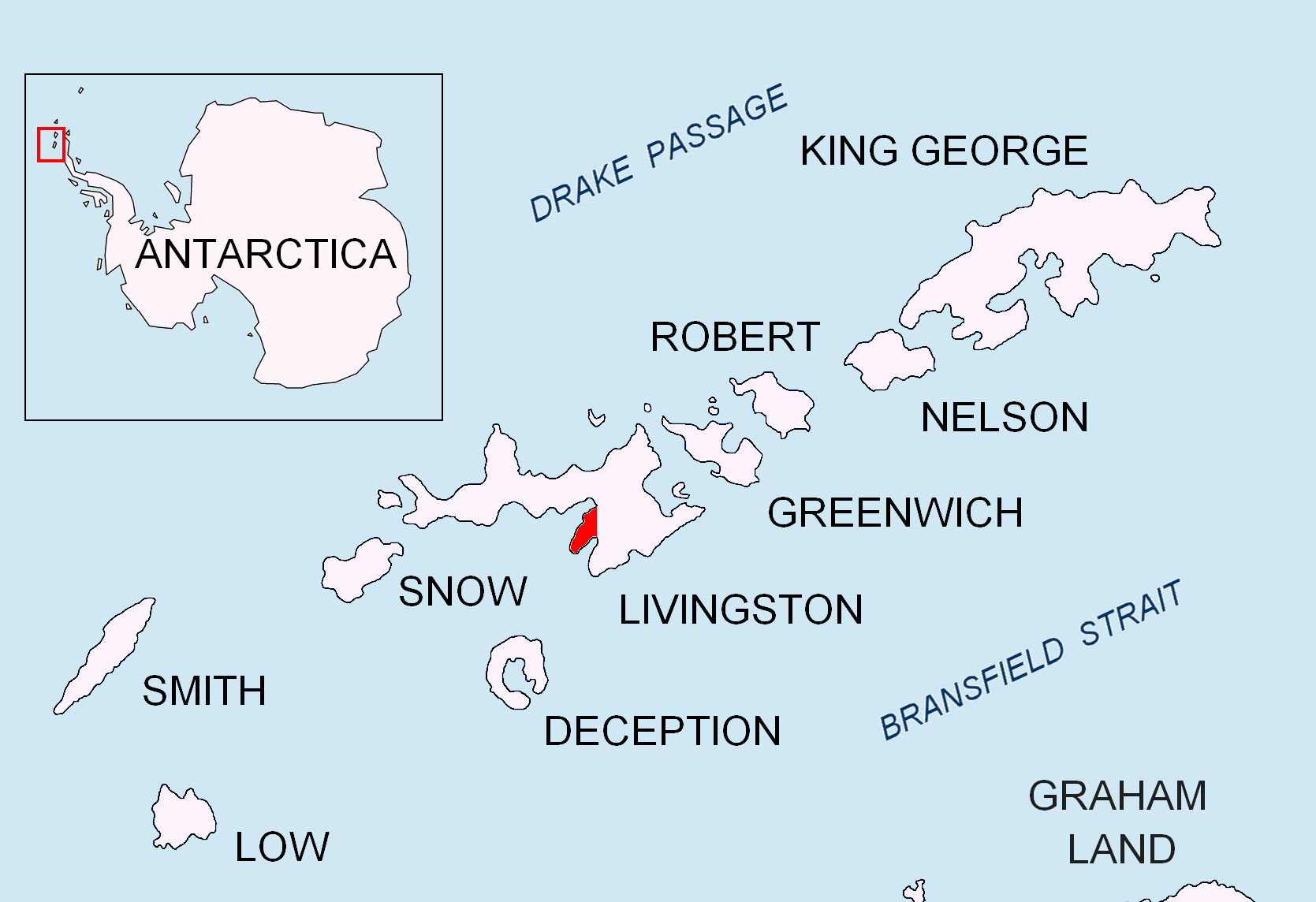
- Location of Hurd Peninsula on Livingston Island in the South Shetland Islands

- Location within South Shetland Islands Location within Antarctica
- Location: Livingston Island; South Shetland Islands
- Coordinates: 62°40′05″S 60°21′00″W
- Length: 1 nautical mile (1.9 km; 1.2 mi)
- Width: 1.2 nautical miles (2.2 km; 1.4 mi)
- Thickness: unknown
- Terminus: Johnsons Dock
- Status: unknown

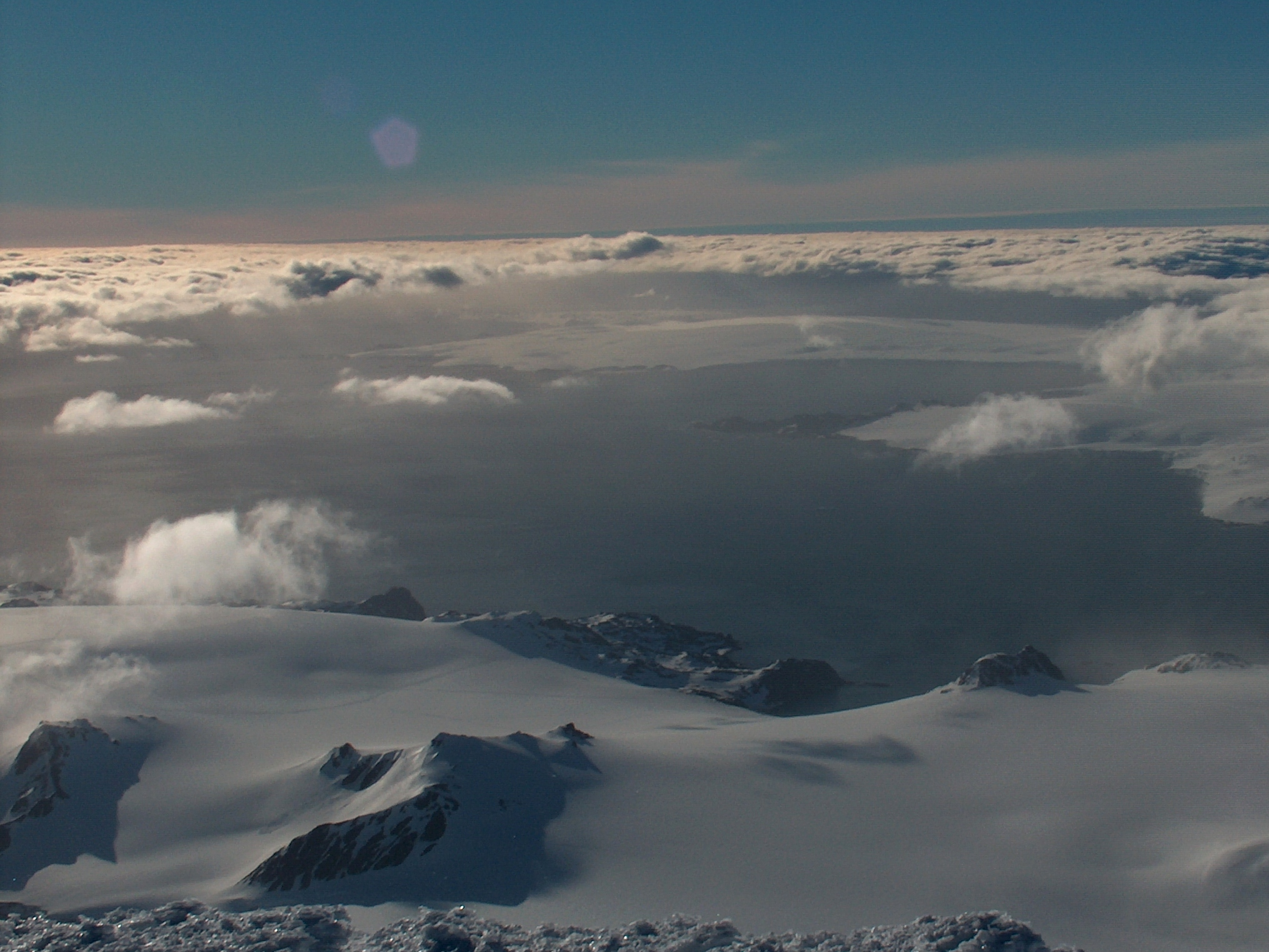
Johnsons Glacier from Mount Friesland, with Napier Peak in the foreground, Charrúa Ridge on the right and Mount Reina Sofia in the background, and South Bay, Hannah Point and western Livingston Island further away.

Topographic map of Livingston Island.

Johnsons Glacier is the 1.8 km long and 2.3 km wide glacier on Hurd Peninsula, Livingston Island in the South Shetland Islands, Antarctica bounded by Charrúa Ridge and Charrúa Gap to the north, Napier Peak to the east, Mirador Hill to the southeast, Hurd Ice Cap (from which it receives ice influx) to the southwest and Mount Reina Sofía to the west. It is draining northwestwards into Johnsons Dock. The glacier provides overland access from the Spanish base Juan Carlos Primero to the interior of the eastern Livingston Island.

The feature receives its name from the adjacent Johnsons Dock.

== Location ==
The midpoint of the glacier is located at 62°40′05″S 60°21′00″W (Detailed Spanish mapping in 1991, and Bulgarian mapping in 1996, 2005 and 2009).

== See also ==
- List of glaciers in the Antarctic
- Glaciology

== Maps ==
- Isla Livingston: Península Hurd. Mapa topográfico de escala 1:25000. Madrid: Servicio Geográfico del Ejército, 1991. (Map reproduced on p. 16 of the linked work)
- L.L. Ivanov. Livingston Island: Central-Eastern Region. Scale 1:25000 topographic map. Sofia: Antarctic Place-names Commission of Bulgaria, 1996.
- L.L. Ivanov et al. Antarctica: Livingston Island and Greenwich Island, South Shetland Islands. Scale 1:100000 topographic map. Sofia: Antarctic Place-names Commission of Bulgaria, 2005.
- L.L. Ivanov. Antarctica: Livingston Island and Greenwich, Robert, Snow and Smith Islands. Scale 1:120000 topographic map. Troyan: Manfred Wörner Foundation, 2009. ISBN 978-954-92032-6-4
- Antarctic Digital Database (ADD). Scale 1:250000 topographic map of Antarctica. Scientific Committee on Antarctic Research (SCAR). Since 1993, regularly upgraded and updated.
- L.L. Ivanov. Antarctica: Livingston Island and Smith Island. Scale 1:100000 topographic map. Manfred Wörner Foundation, 2017. ISBN 978-619-90008-3-0
