= Contell Glacier =

Glacier in Antarctica

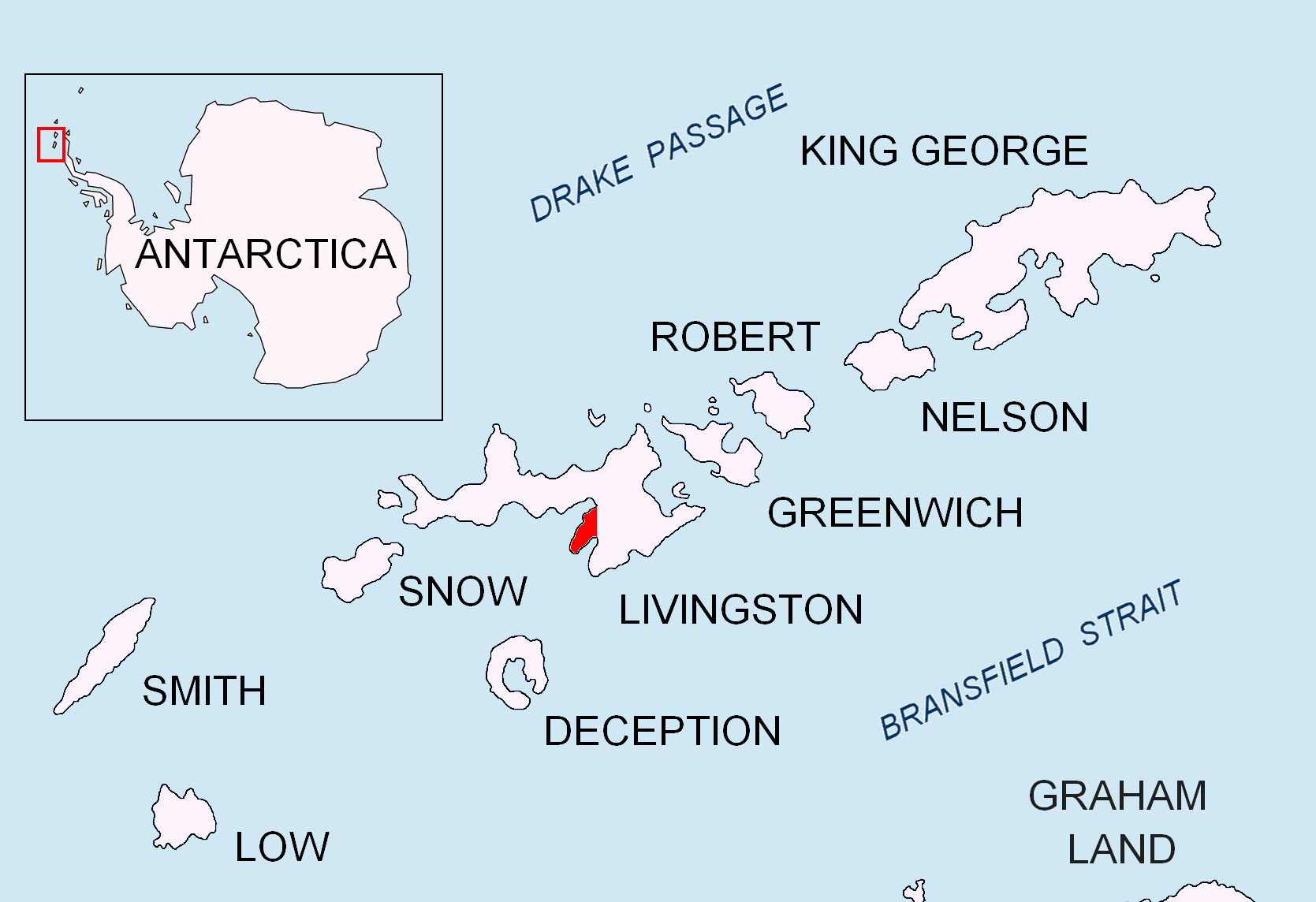
- Location of Hurd Peninsula, Livingston Island in the South Shetland Islands

- Location within South Shetland Islands Location within Antarctica
- Location: Livingston Island; South Shetland Islands
- Coordinates: 62°39′04″S 60°21′00″W
- Length: 1.2 nautical miles (2.2 km; 1.4 mi)
- Width: 0.4 nautical miles (0.74 km; 0.46 mi)
- Thickness: unknown
- Terminus: South Bay
- Status: unknown

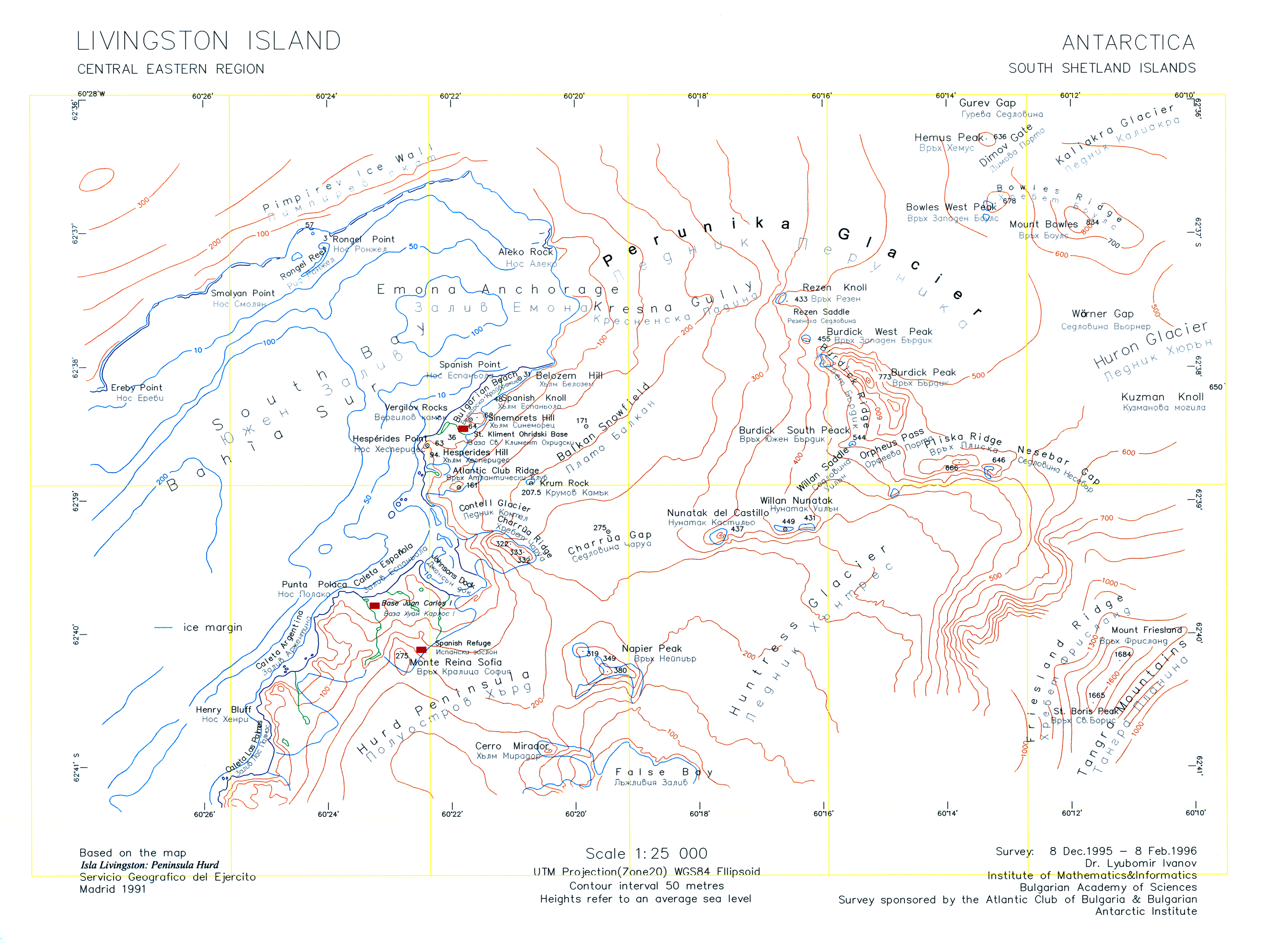
Topographic map of central-eastern Livingston Island featuring Contell Glacier.

Topographic map of Livingston Island and Smith Island.

Contell Glacier is 1.2 nmi (2 km; 1 mi) long and 0.4 nautical miles (0.74 km; 0.46 mi) wide glacier on Hurd Peninsula, Livingston Island in the South Shetland Islands, Antarctica bounded by Atlantic Club Ridge to the northwest, Krum Rock to the north, Balkan Snowfield to the northeast, and Charrúa Ridge and Charrúa Gap to the south. It is crescent-shaped, running northwestwards in its upper course, then between Charrúa Ridge and Krum Rock turning west-southwestwards to flow into South Bay north of Johnsons Dock.

The feature was first named on a 1988 Spanish chart as Glaciar Contell.

== Location ==
The midpoint of the glacier is located at 62°39′04″S 60°21′00″W (Detailed Spanish mapping in 1991, and Bulgarian mapping in 1996, 2005 and 2009).

== See also ==
- List of glaciers in the Antarctic
- Glaciology

== Maps ==
- Isla Livingston: Península Hurd. Mapa topográfico de escala 1:25000. Madrid: Servicio Geográfico del Ejército, 1991. (Map reproduced on p. 16 of the linked work)
- L.L. Ivanov. Livingston Island: Central-Eastern Region. Scale 1:25000 topographic map. Sofia: Antarctic Place-names Commission of Bulgaria, 1996.
- L.L. Ivanov et al. Antarctica: Livingston Island and Greenwich Island, South Shetland Islands. Scale 1:100000 topographic map. Sofia: Antarctic Place-names Commission of Bulgaria, 2005.
- L.L. Ivanov. Antarctica: Livingston Island and Greenwich, Robert, Snow and Smith Islands. Scale 1:120000 topographic map. Troyan: Manfred Wörner Foundation, 2009. ISBN 978-954-92032-6-4
- Antarctic Digital Database (ADD). Scale 1:250000 topographic map of Antarctica. Scientific Committee on Antarctic Research (SCAR). Since 1993, regularly upgraded and updated.
- L.L. Ivanov. Antarctica: Livingston Island and Smith Island. Scale 1:100000 topographic map. Manfred Wörner Foundation, 2017. ISBN 978-619-90008-3-0
