= Balkan Snowfield =

Ice-covered plateau on Livingston Island, Antarctica

- Plateau
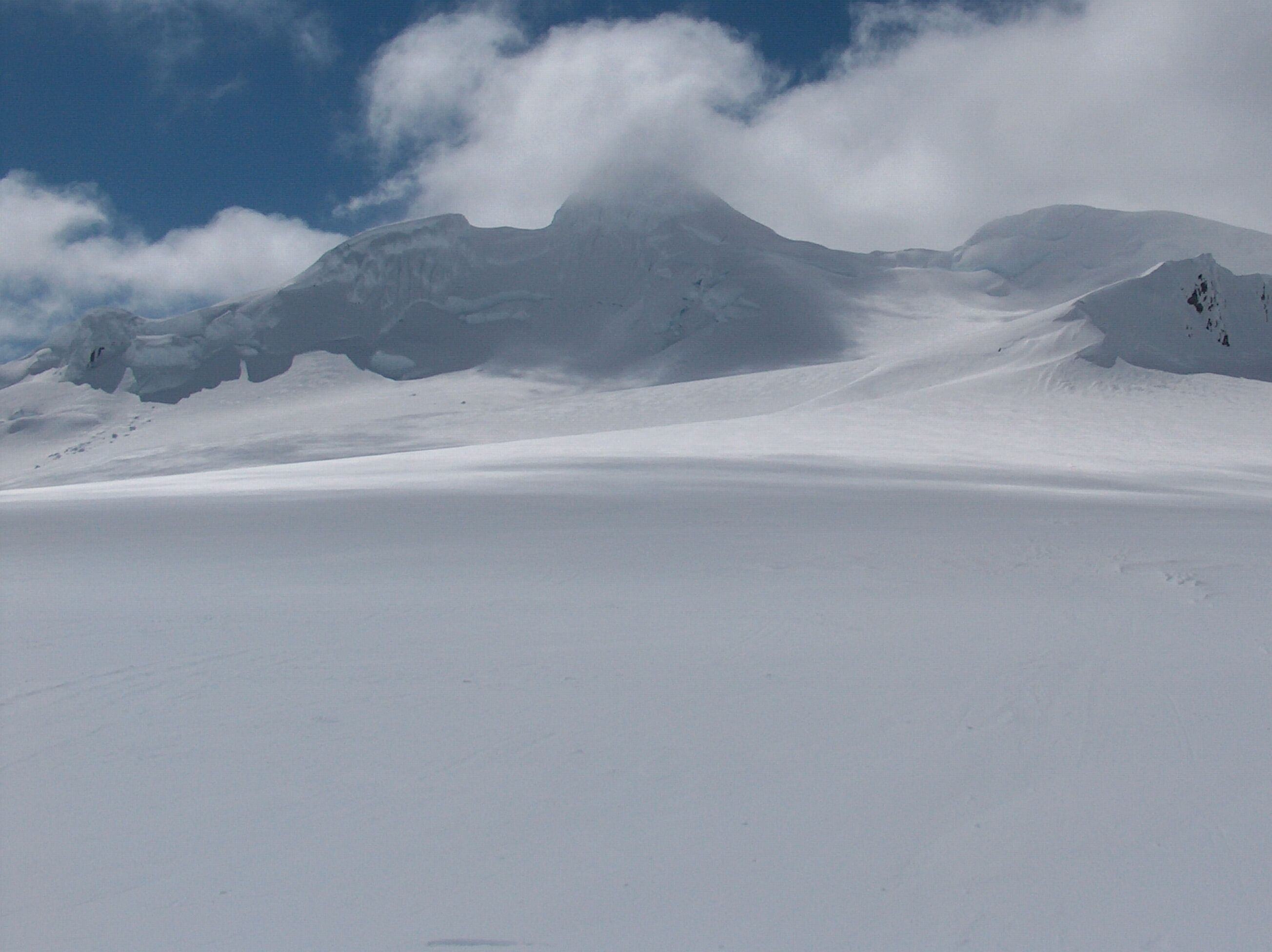
- Balkan Snowfield from near Willan Nunatak, with Burdick Ridge in the background

- Location within Antarctica
- Coordinates: 62°38′36″S 60°19′18″W
- Location: Livingston Island, South Shetland Islands, Antarctica
- Etymology: Balkans

Dimensions
  - Length: 3 km (1.9 mi)
- Elevation: 150 to 280 m (490 to 920 ft)

Balkan Snowfield (Plato Balkan \'pla-to bal-'kan\) is an ice-covered plateau of elevation ranging from 150 to 280 m (490 to 920 ft) in eastern Livingston Island in the South Shetland Islands, Antarctica, situated south of lower Perunika Glacier, northwest of Huntress Glacier and north of Contell Glacier. It is 3 km (1.9 mi) long in southwest–northeast direction and 2 km (1.2 mi), and bounded by Burdick Ridge to the east, Willan Nunatak and Castillo Nunatak to the southeast, and Krum Rock to the southwest. The feature slopes gently northwestwards with its foot bounded by the hills along Bulgarian Beach. It is named after the Balkans.

== Location ==
The midpoint of the snowfield is located at 62°38′36″S 60°19′18″W. Detailed mapping by the Spanish Servicio Geográfico del Ejército in 1991, and Bulgarian mapping in 1996, 2004 and 2009.

== Maps ==
Location of Livingston Island in the South Shetland Islands.

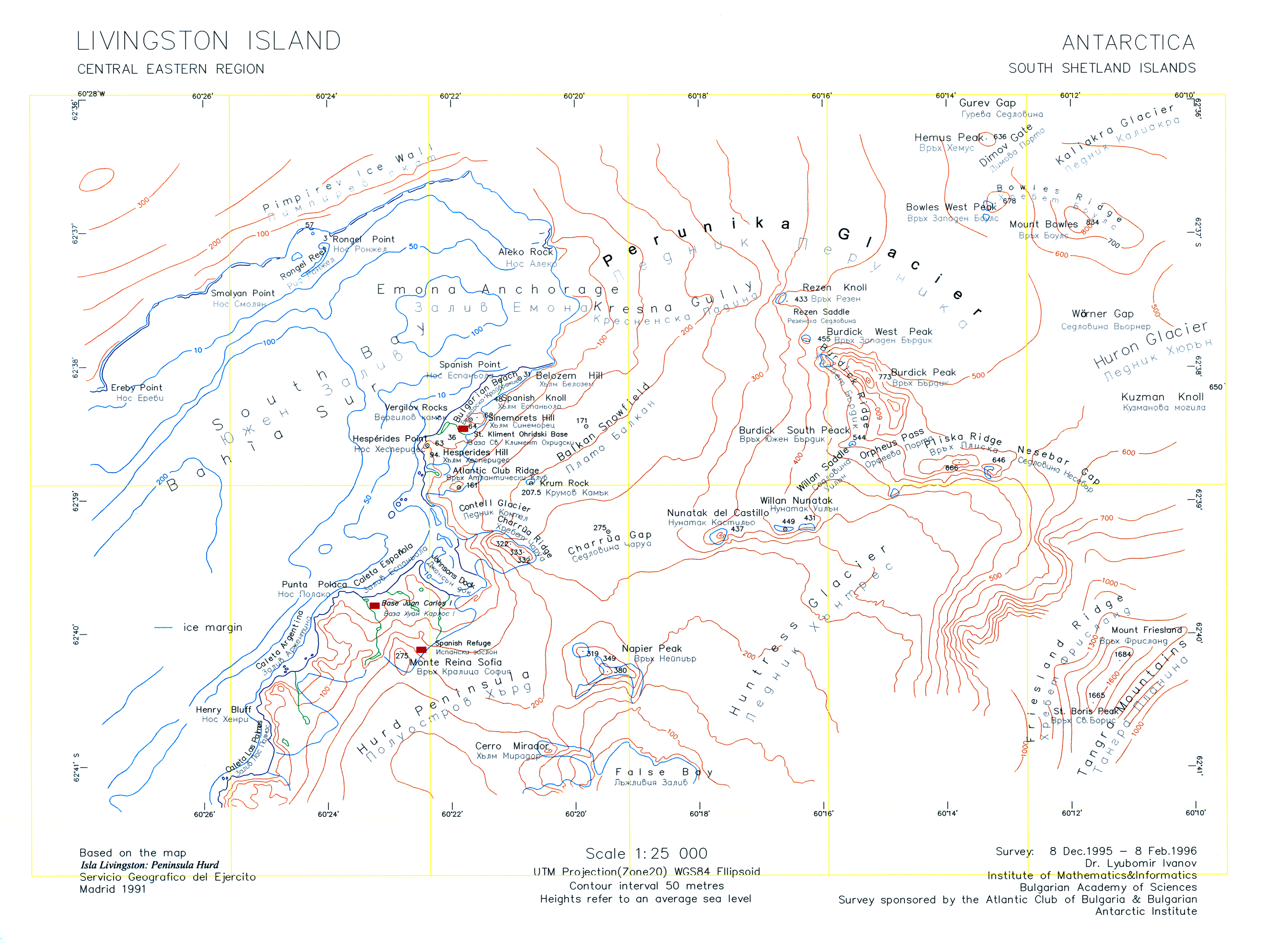
Topographic map of central-eastern Livingston Island featuring Balkan Snowfield.

Topographic map of Livingston Island and Smith Island.

- Isla Livingston: Península Hurd. Mapa topográfico de escala 1:25000. Madrid: Servicio Geográfico del Ejército, 1991. (Map reproduced on p. 16 of the linked work)
- L.L. Ivanov. Livingston Island: Central-Eastern Region. Scale 1:25000 topographic map. Sofia: Antarctic Place-names Commission of Bulgaria, 1996.
- L.L. Ivanov et al. Antarctica: Livingston Island and Greenwich Island, South Shetland Islands. Scale 1:100000 topographic map. Sofia: Antarctic Place-names Commission of Bulgaria, 2005.
- L.L. Ivanov. Antarctica: Livingston Island and Greenwich, Robert, Snow and Smith Islands. Scale 1:120000 topographic map. Troyan: Manfred Wörner Foundation, 2009. ISBN 978-954-92032-6-4
- Antarctic Digital Database (ADD). Scale 1:250000 topographic map of Antarctica. Scientific Committee on Antarctic Research (SCAR). Since 1993, regularly upgraded and updated.
- L.L. Ivanov. Antarctica: Livingston Island and Smith Island. Scale 1:100000 topographic map. Manfred Wörner Foundation, 2017. ISBN 978-619-90008-3-0
- A. Kamburov and L. Ivanov. Bowles Ridge and Central Tangra Mountains: Livingston Island, Antarctica. Scale 1:25000 map. Sofia: Manfred Wörner Foundation, 2023. ISBN 978-619-90008-6-1

== See also ==
- Hurd Peninsula
- Livingston Island
