= Napier Peak =

Mountain in Livingston Island, South Shetland Islands, Antarctica

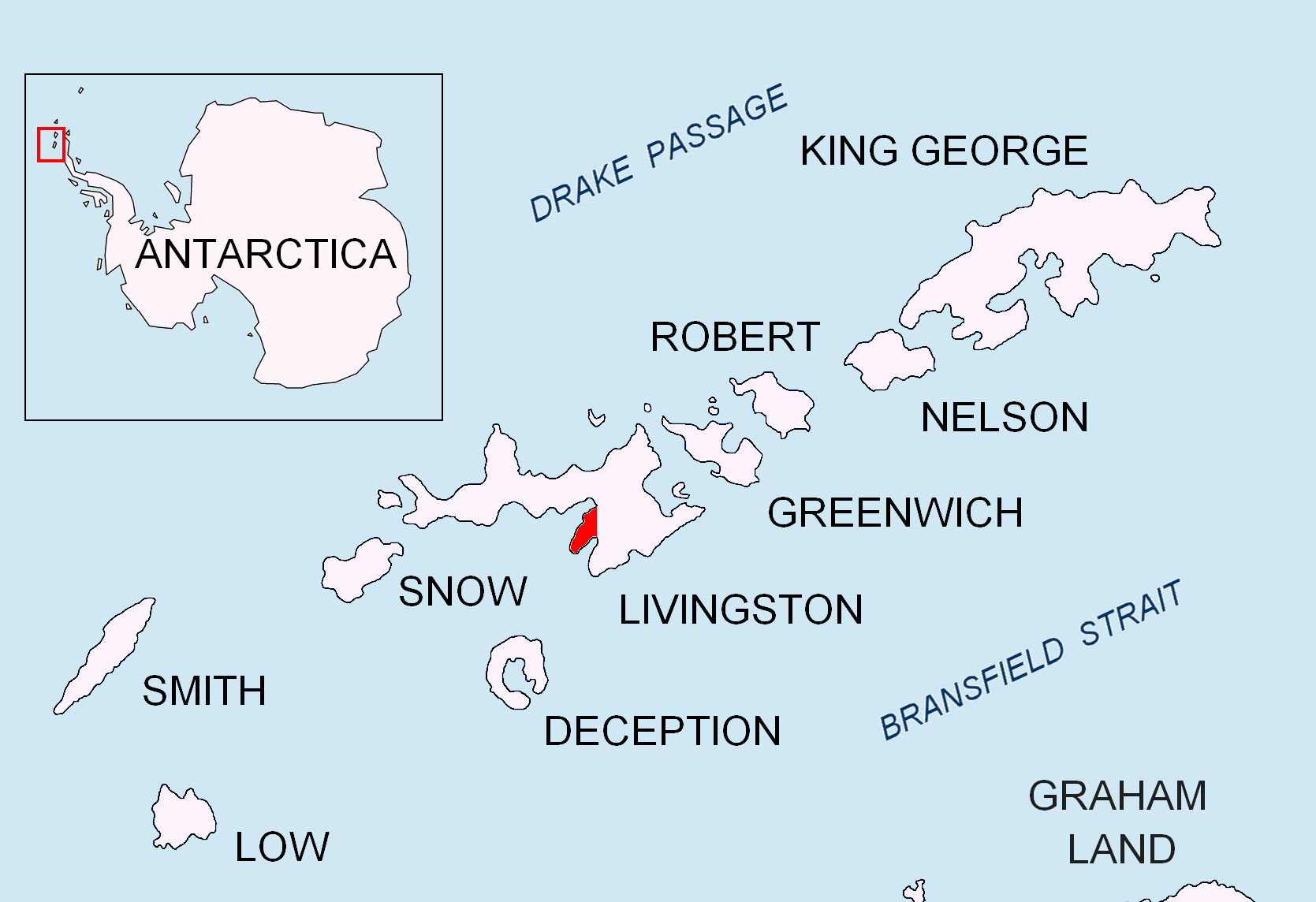
Location of Hurd Peninsula in the South Shetland Islands.

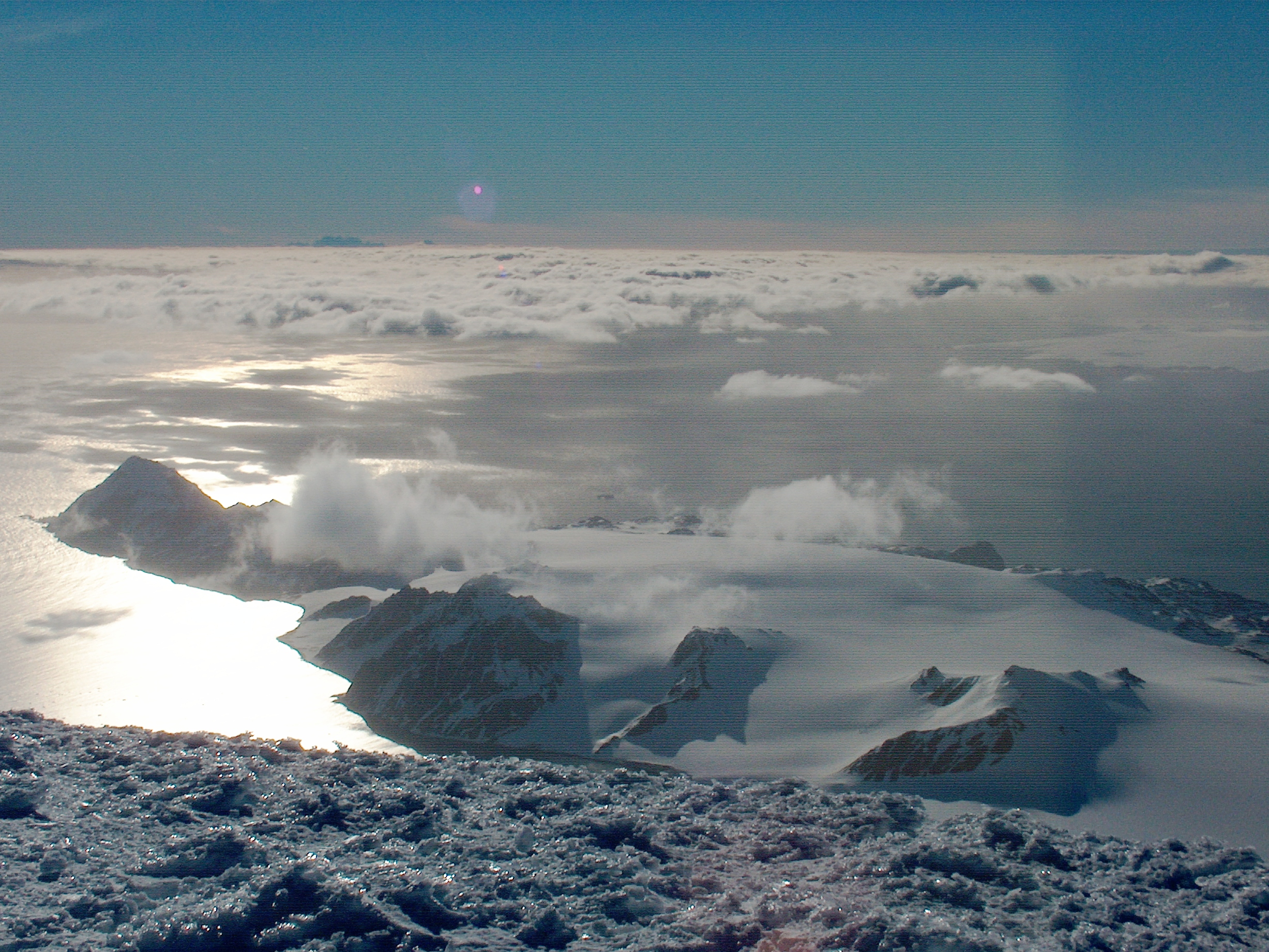
Napier Peak (on the right) from Mount Friesland.

Topographic map of Livingston Island and Smith Island.

Napier Peak is the partly ice-free peak rising to 380 m on Hurd Peninsula, Livingston Island in the South Shetland Islands, Antarctica. It is linked to Charrúa Gap to the north by a 1.5 km ice-covered col, and by an ice-covered saddle to Mirador Hill to the south-southwest, and surmounts Johnsons Glacier to the northwest and west, Huntress Glacier to the east, and False Bay to the south.

The feature is named after Captain William Napier, Master of the schooner Venus, from New York, who visited the South Shetland Islands in 1820–21.

== Location ==
The peak is located at 62°40′17.4″S 60°19′30.5″W which is 2.05 km southeast of Charrúa Ridge, 3.21 km southwest of Willan Nunatak, 6.79 km northwest of St. Cyril Peak and 2.2 km north-northeast of Moores Peak (Spanish mapping in 1991, and Bulgarian in 1996, 2005 and 2009).

== Maps ==
- Isla Livingston: Península Hurd. Mapa topográfico de escala 1:25000. Madrid: Servicio Geográfico del Ejército, 1991. (Map reproduced on p. 16 of the linked work)
- L.L. Ivanov. Livingston Island: Central-Eastern Region. Scale 1:25000 topographic map. Sofia: Antarctic Place-names Commission of Bulgaria, 1996.
- L.L. Ivanov et al. Antarctica: Livingston Island and Greenwich Island, South Shetland Islands. Scale 1:100000 topographic map. Sofia: Antarctic Place-names Commission of Bulgaria, 2005.
- L.L. Ivanov. Antarctica: Livingston Island and Greenwich, Robert, Snow and Smith Islands. Scale 1:120000 topographic map. Troyan: Manfred Wörner Foundation, 2009. ISBN 978-954-92032-6-4
- Antarctic Digital Database (ADD). Scale 1:250000 topographic map of Antarctica. Scientific Committee on Antarctic Research (SCAR). Since 1993, regularly upgraded and updated.
- L.L. Ivanov. Antarctica: Livingston Island and Smith Island. Scale 1:100000 topographic map. Manfred Wörner Foundation, 2017. ISBN 978-619-90008-3-0
