= Moores Peak =

Mountain in Livingston Island, South Shetland Islands, Antarctica

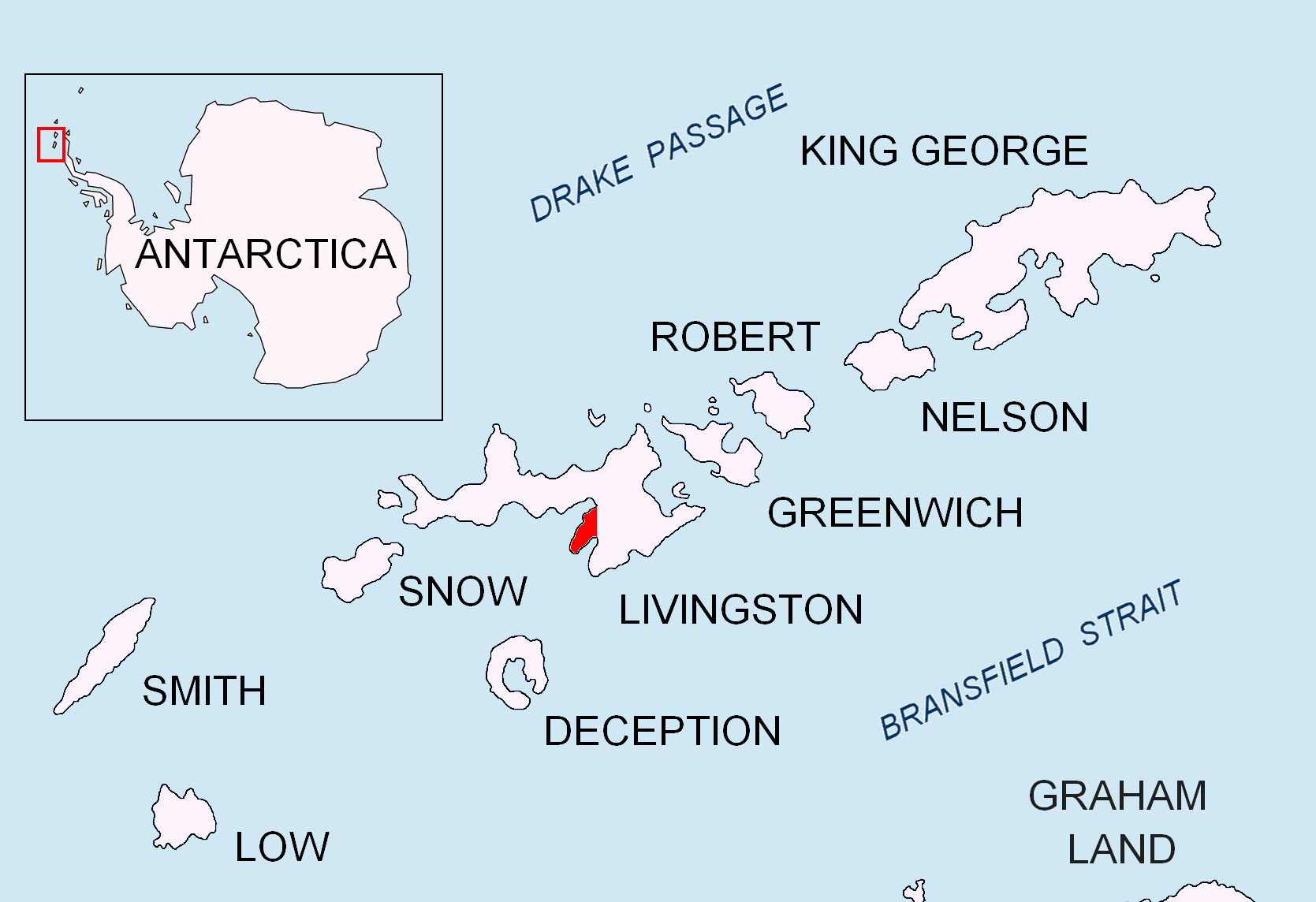
Location of Hurd Peninsula on Livingston Island in the South Shetland Islands.

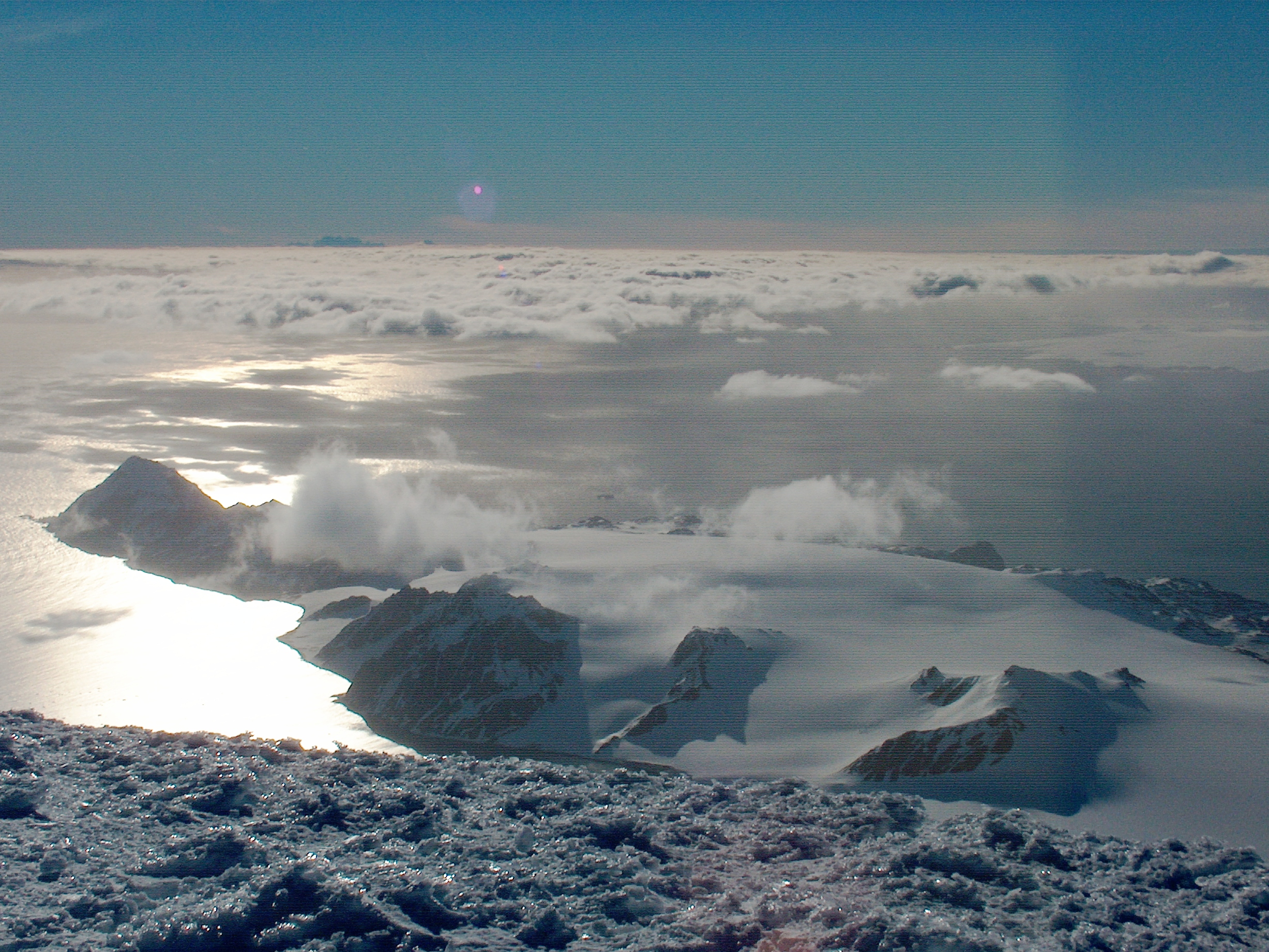
Moores Peak (in the centre, slightly to the left) from Mount Friesland.

Topographic map of Livingston Island and Smith Island.

Moores Peak is the prominent rocky peak rising to 407 m on Hurd Peninsula, Livingston Island in the South Shetland Islands, Antarctica and surmounting False Bay to the southeast.

The feature is named after Captain Prince Moores, Master of the American sealing ship George Porter that visited the South Shetlands in 1821–22.

== Location ==
The peak is located at 62°41′21″S 60°20′37″W which is 880 m south by west of Mirador Hill, 2.2 km south-southwest of Napier Peak, 4.47 km west by north of Kikish Crag and 2.21 km east-northeast of Castellvi Peak (British mapping in 1968, Spanish in 1991, and Bulgarian in 2005 and 2009).

== Maps ==
- Isla Livingston: Península Hurd. Mapa topográfico de escala 1:25000. Madrid: Servicio Geográfico del Ejército, 1991. (Map reproduced on p. 16 of the linked work)
- L.L. Ivanov et al. Antarctica: Livingston Island and Greenwich Island, South Shetland Islands. Scale 1:100000 topographic map. Sofia: Antarctic Place-names Commission of Bulgaria, 2005.
- L.L. Ivanov. Antarctica: Livingston Island and Greenwich, Robert, Snow and Smith Islands. Scale 1:120000 topographic map. Troyan: Manfred Wörner Foundation, 2009. ISBN 978-954-92032-6-4
- Antarctic Digital Database (ADD). Scale 1:250000 topographic map of Antarctica. Scientific Committee on Antarctic Research (SCAR). Since 1993, regularly upgraded and updated.
- L.L. Ivanov. Antarctica: Livingston Island and Smith Island. Scale 1:100000 topographic map. Manfred Wörner Foundation, 2017. ISBN 978-619-90008-3-0
