= Hurd Peninsula =

Peninsula between South Bay and False Bay on the south coast of Livingston Island

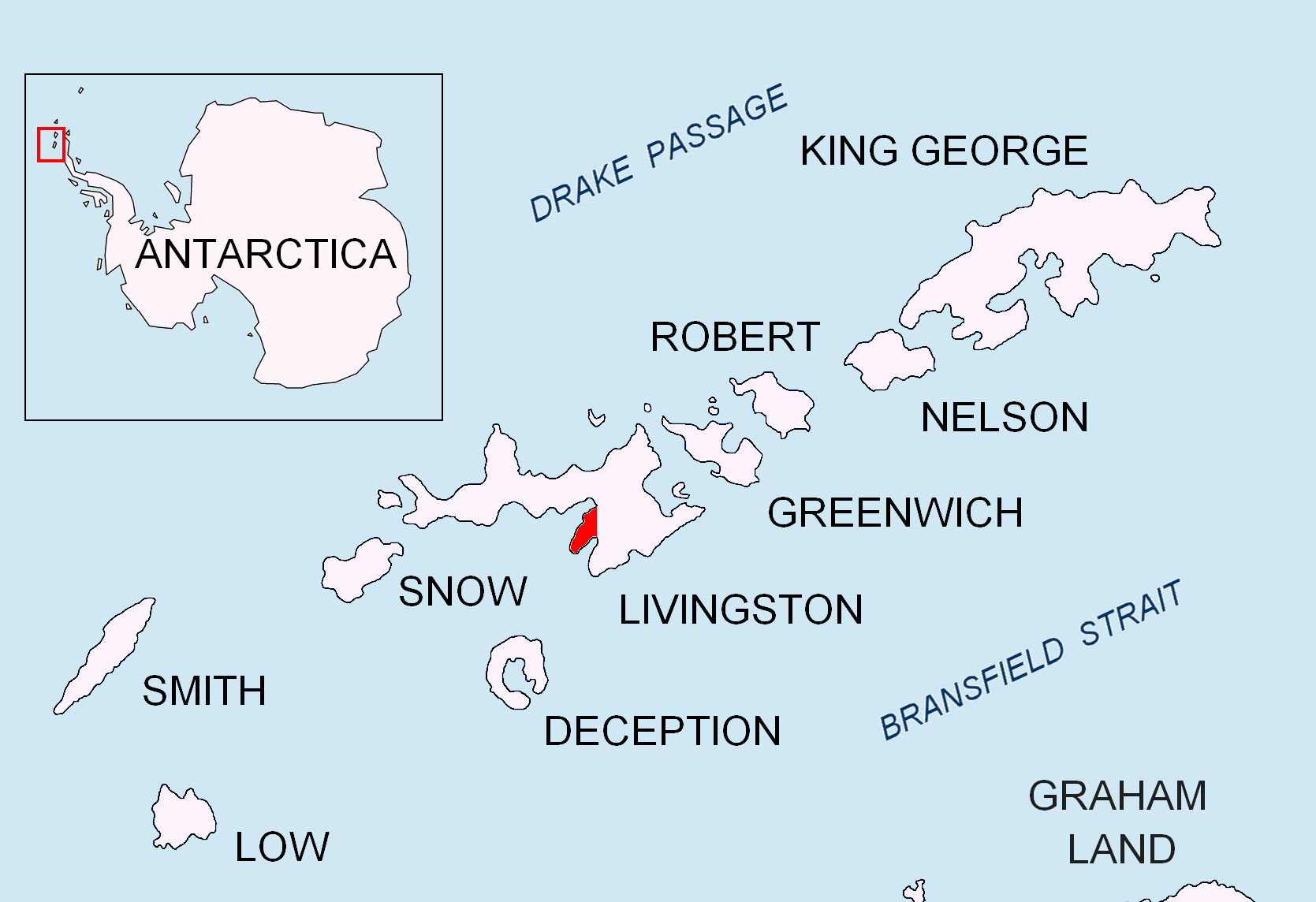
Location of Hurd Peninsula on Livingston Island in the South Shetland Islands.

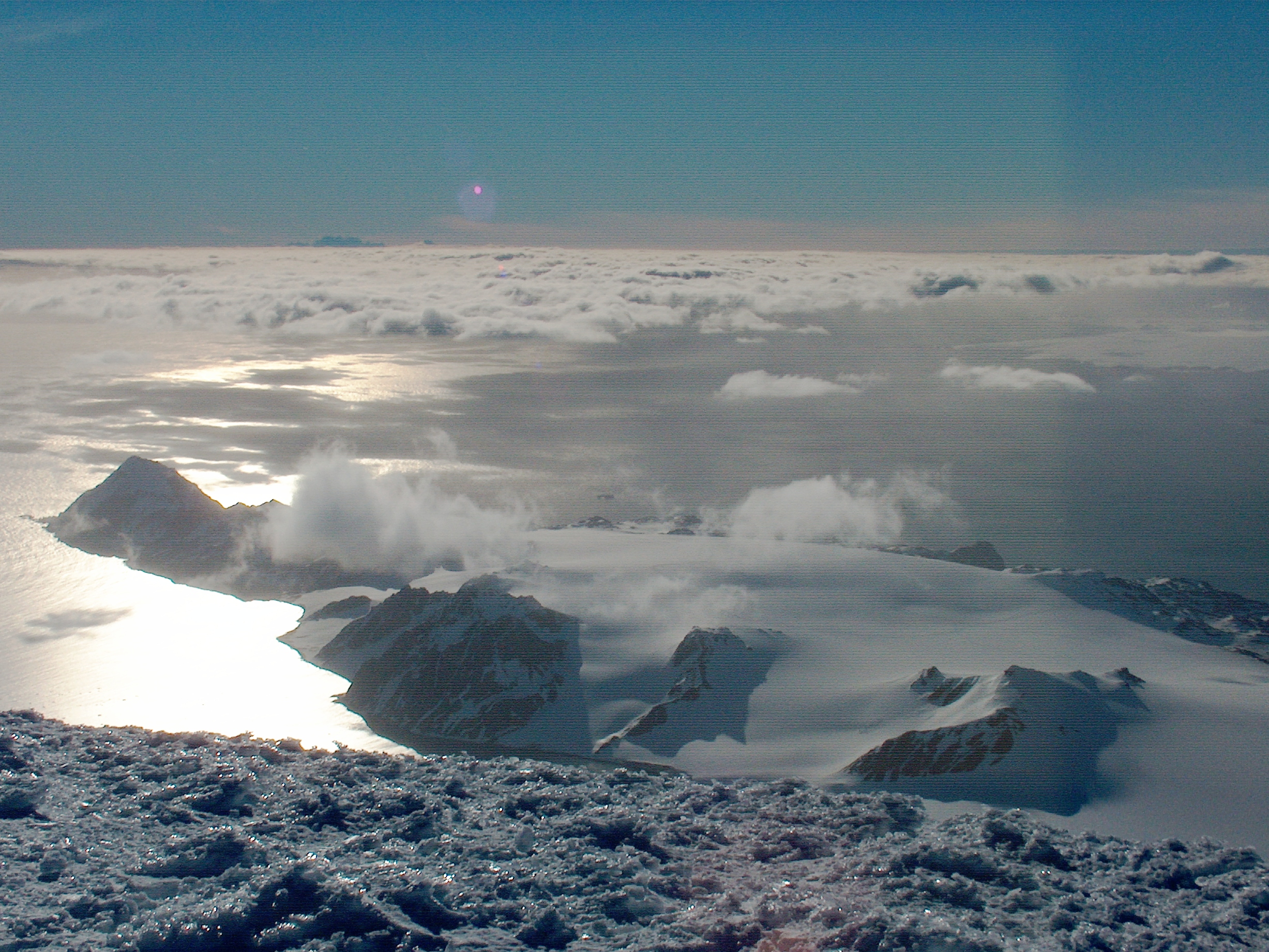
Hurd Peninsula from Mount Friesland.

Topographic map of Livingston Island.

Hurd Peninsula lies between South Bay and False Bay on the south coast of Livingston Island in the South Shetland Islands, Antarctica. The Spanish Juan Carlos I Antarctic Base and the Bulgarian St. Kliment Ohridski Base are situated on its west coast.

The peninsula was named by the UK Antarctic Place-Names Committee in 1961 for Captain Thomas Hurd, Royal Navy, the second Hydrographer to the British Admiralty, 1808–23, who instituted a regular system of nautical surveys, and under whose authority Lieutenant Edward Bransfield's 1820 survey of the Bransfield Strait area was published in November 1822.

== Location ==
The midpoint of the peninsula is located at 62°40′33″S 60°21′59″W (Detailed Spanish mapping in 1991, and Bulgarian in 2005 and 2009).

== Maps ==
- Chart of South Shetland including Coronation Island, &c. from the exploration of the sloop Dove in the years 1821 and 1822 by George Powell Commander of the same. Scale ca. 1:200000. London: Laurie, 1822.
- South Shetland Islands. Scale 1:200000 topographic map. DOS 610 Sheet W 62 60. Tolworth, UK, 1968.
- Islas Livingston y Decepción. Mapa topográfico a escala 1:100000. Madrid: Servicio Geográfico del Ejército, 1991.
- Isla Livingston: Península Hurd. Mapa topográfico de escala 1:25000. Madrid: Servicio Geográfico del Ejército, 1991. (The map is reproduced on p. 16 of the linked work)
- L.L. Ivanov et al. Antarctica: Livingston Island and Greenwich Island, South Shetland Islands. Scale 1:100000 topographic map. Sofia: Antarctic Place-names Commission of Bulgaria, 2005.
- L.L. Ivanov. Antarctica: Livingston Island and Greenwich, Robert, Snow and Smith Islands. Scale 1:120000 topographic map. Troyan: Manfred Wörner Foundation, 2010. ISBN 978-954-92032-9-5 (First edition 2009. ISBN 978-954-92032-6-4)
- Antarctic Digital Database (ADD). Scale 1:250000 topographic map of Antarctica. Scientific Committee on Antarctic Research (SCAR). Since 1993, regularly updated.
- L.L. Ivanov. Antarctica: Livingston Island and Smith Island. Scale 1:100000 topographic map. Manfred Wörner Foundation, 2017. ISBN 978-619-90008-3-0
