= St. Ivan Rilski Chapel =

Chapel in Antarctica

Coordinates: 62°38′30″S 60°21′47″W

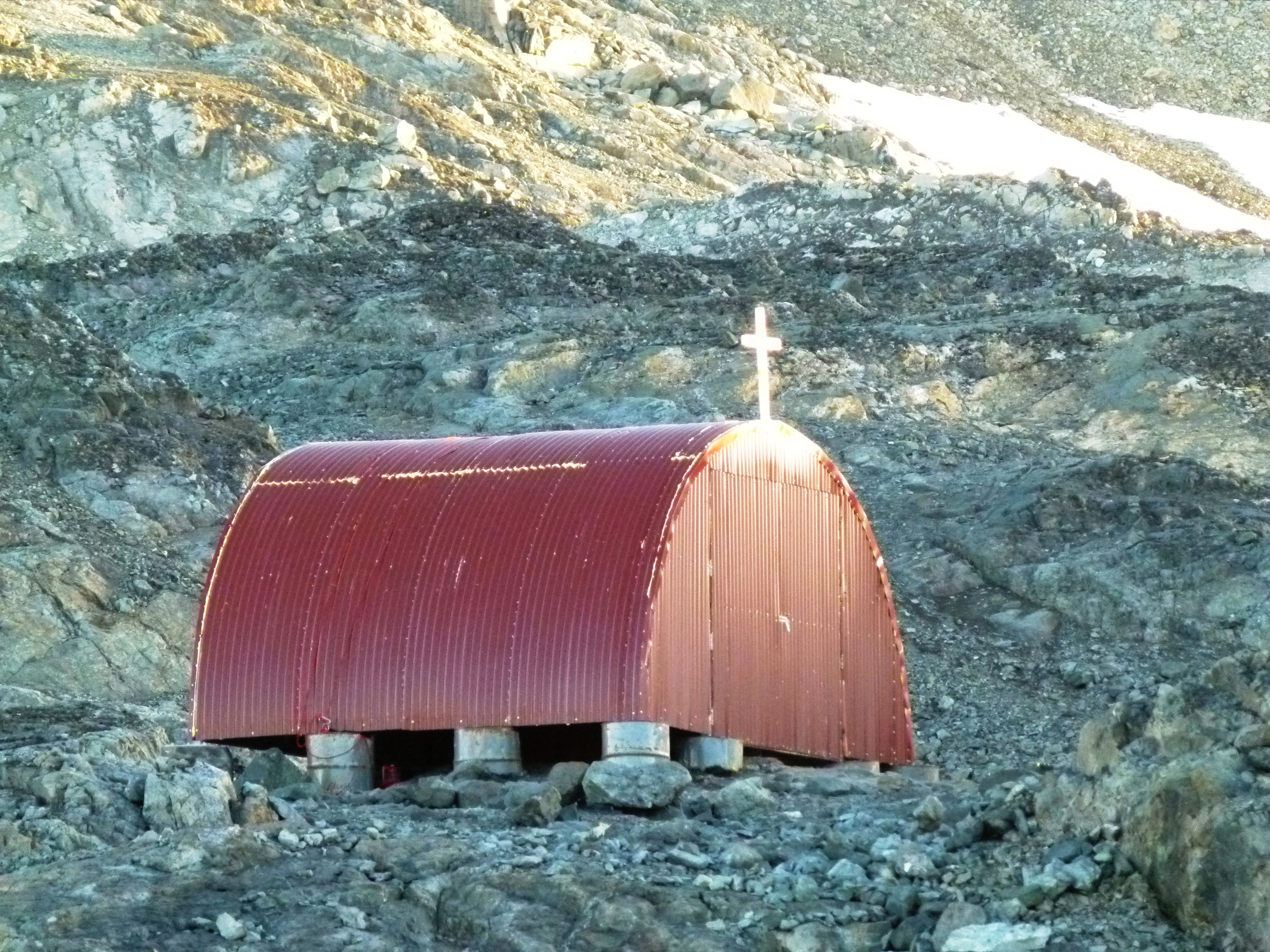
- The new chapel building in 2012.
- Interactive map of the St. Ivan Rilski Chapel area

General information
- Type: Chapel
- Location: St. Kliment Ohridski Base, Livingston Island, South Shetland Islands
- Completed: 2003 (old building); 2012 (new building)

Technical details
- Floor count: 1

The St. Ivan Rilski Chapel (St. John of Rila Chapel, Bulgarian: Параклис Свети Иван Рилски) at the St. Kliment Ohridski Base of Bulgaria, on Livingston Island in the South Shetland Islands is the first Eastern Orthodox edifice in Antarctica, the southernmost Eastern Orthodox building of worship in the world (cf. Trinity Church, Antarctica), and one of eight churches on Antarctica.

== History ==
The chapel was named after the patron of the Bulgarians, St. Ivan Rilski. It was built with the assistance of the Bulgarian Antarctic scientific team, whose research season lasts from the beginning of the winter until the beginning of spring in the Northern Hemisphere. During this time, the base employs a total of between 12 and 15 people, geologists, biologists, doctors, meteorologists, botanists and others.

The three foundation stones of the 3.5 by 3.5 m building were laid on 9 December 2001 by deacon Lyubomir Bratoev, who participated in the tenth Antarctic expedition the next year.

The chapel was shipped in pieces totaling three cubic meters and three tons, via a Spanish ship. The completed chapel was consecrated on 9 February 2003.

The chapel’s bell was donated by Nikola Vasilev, ex-Vice Premier of Bulgaria who worked as a doctor at the Bulgarian base in the 1993/94 season, while the roof cross was donated by the Bulgarian artist Dicho Kapushev. The chapel features an icon of Jesus Christ the Bridegroom by the Bulgarian artist Georgi Dimov, and an icon of St. Ivan Rilski donated by President Georgi Parvanov of Bulgaria, who visited and lit a candle in the chapel on 15 January 2005.

St. Ivan Rilski Chapel was provided with new premises in the 2011/2012 season, situated on the northeast slopes of Pesyakov Hill nearer to the main buildings of the Bulgarian base.

== Gallery ==
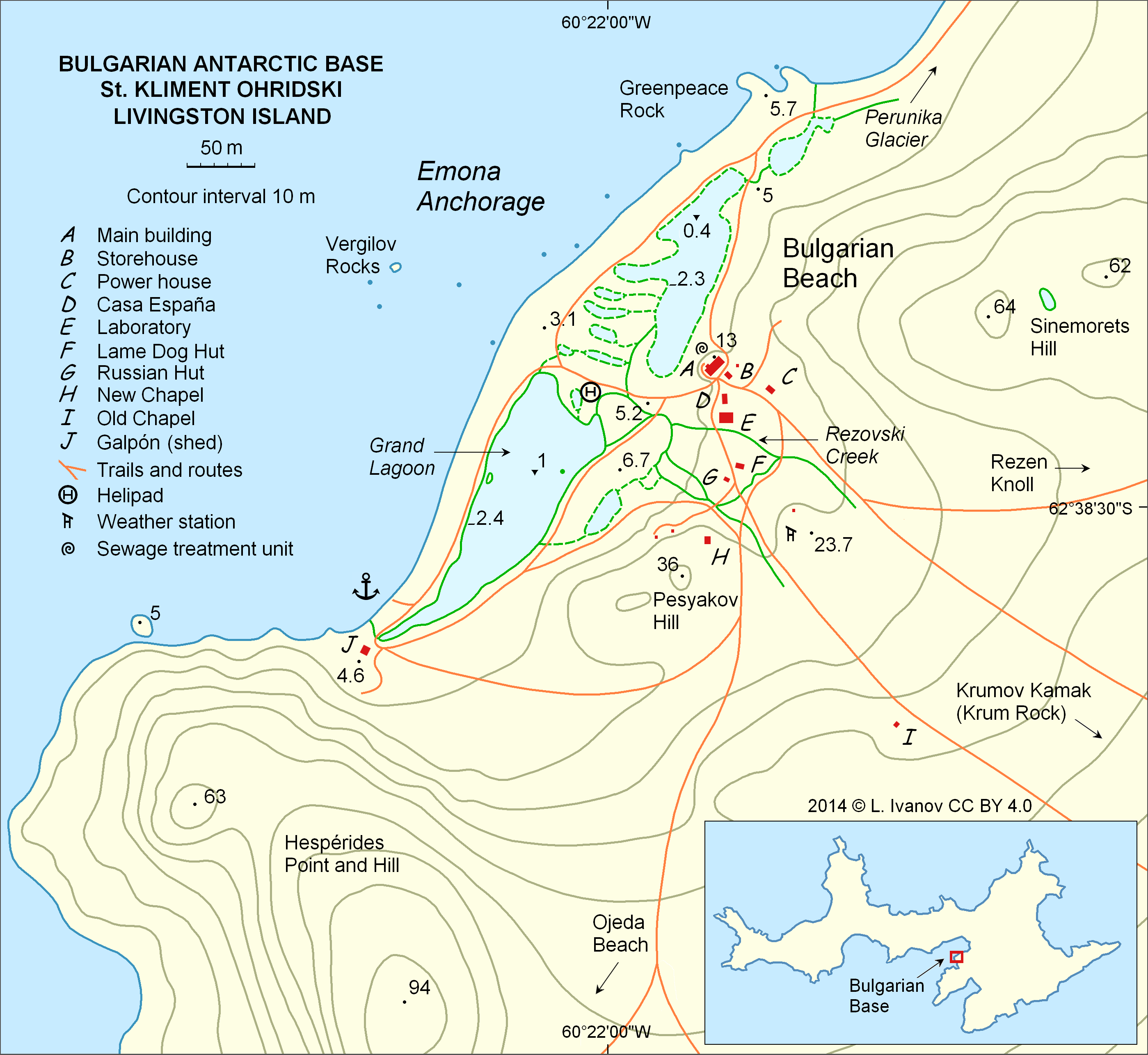
Topographic map of the St. Kliment Ohridski Base area featuring the chapel's old and new premises.

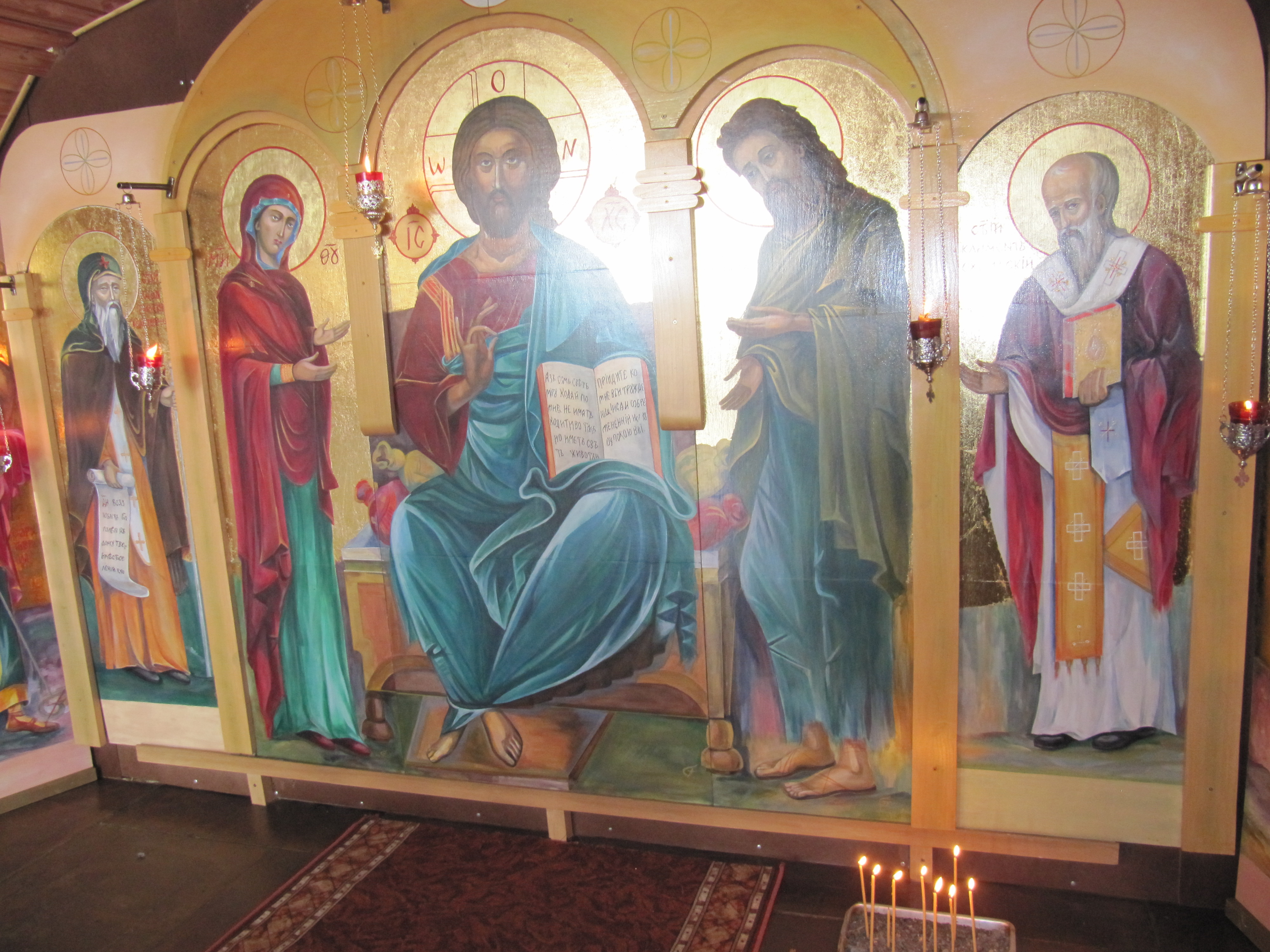
St. Ivan Rilski Chapel's altar.

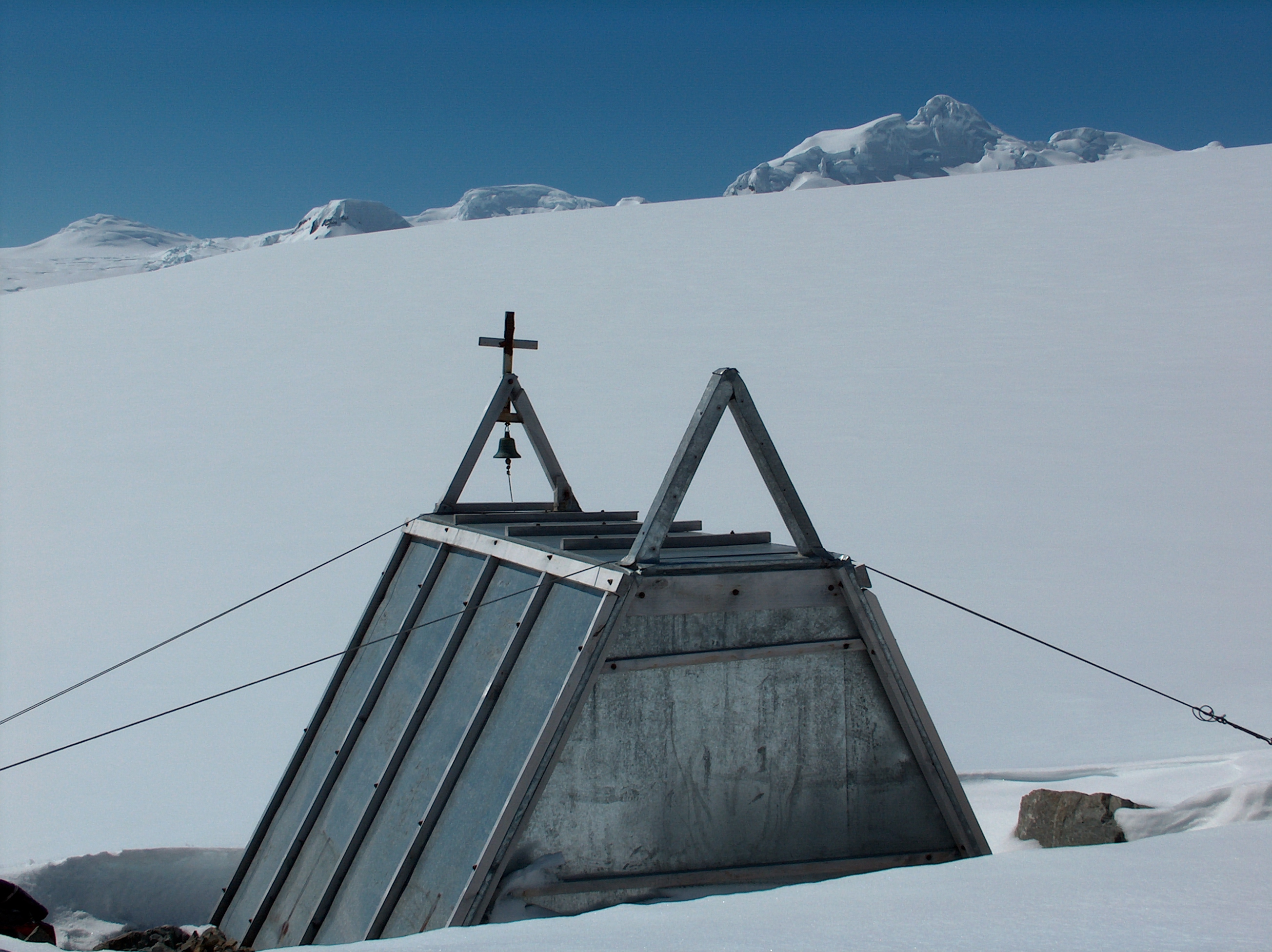
The old St. Ivan Rilski Chapel.

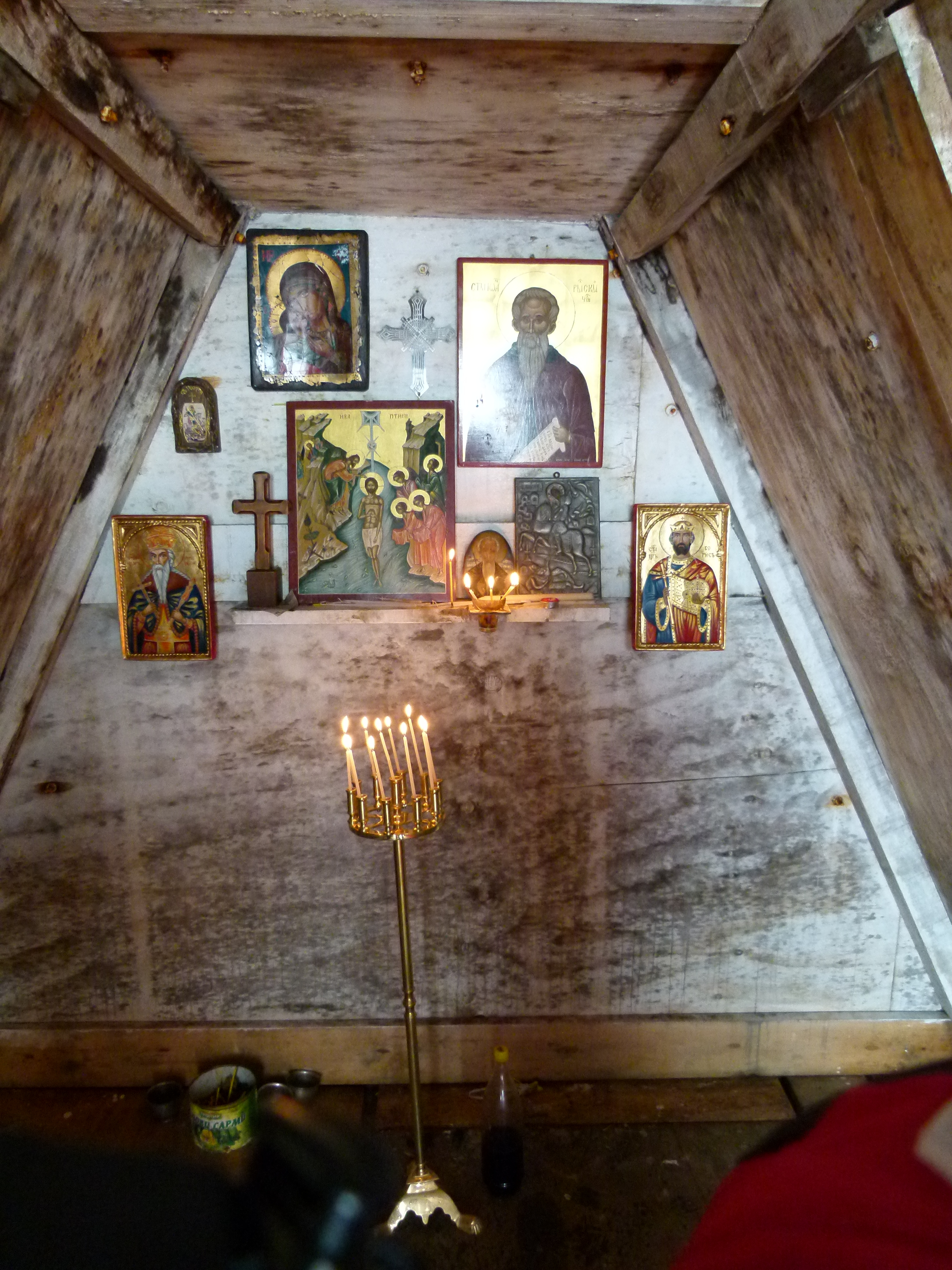
The interior of the old chapel in 2011.

== See also ==
- St. Kliment Ohridski Base
- Livingston Island
- Religion in Antarctica
- Trinity Church, Antarctica

== Maps ==
- Isla Livingston: Península Hurd. Mapa topográfico de escala 1:25000. Madrid: Servicio Geográfico del Ejército, 1991. (Map reproduced on p. 16 of the linked work)
- L.L. Ivanov. St. Kliment Ohridski Base, Livingston Island. Scale 1:1000 topographic map. Sofia: Antarctic Place-names Commission of Bulgaria, 1996. (The first Bulgarian Antarctic topographic map, in Bulgarian)
- L.L. Ivanov et al. Antarctica: Livingston Island and Greenwich Island, South Shetland Islands (from English Strait to Morton Strait, with illustrations and ice-cover distribution). Scale 1:100000 topographic map. Sofia: Antarctic Place-names Commission of Bulgaria, 2005
- L.L. Ivanov. Antarctica: Livingston Island and Greenwich, Robert, Snow and Smith Islands. Scale 1:120000 topographic map. Troyan: Manfred Wörner Foundation, 2009. ISBN 978-954-92032-6-4
- Antarctica, South Shetland Islands, Livingston Island: Bulgarian Antarctic Base. Sheets 1 and 2. Scale 1:2000 topographic map. Geodesy, Cartography and Cadastre Agency, 2016. (in Bulgarian)
- Antarctic Digital Database (ADD). Scale 1:250000 topographic map of Antarctica. Scientific Committee on Antarctic Research (SCAR). Since 1993, regularly upgraded and updated.
- L.L. Ivanov. Antarctica: Livingston Island and Smith Island. Scale 1:100000 topographic map. Manfred Wörner Foundation, 2017. ISBN 978-619-90008-3-0
