= St. Kliment Ohridski Base =

Bulgarian Antarctic base

St. Kliment Ohridski Station
- Antarctic base
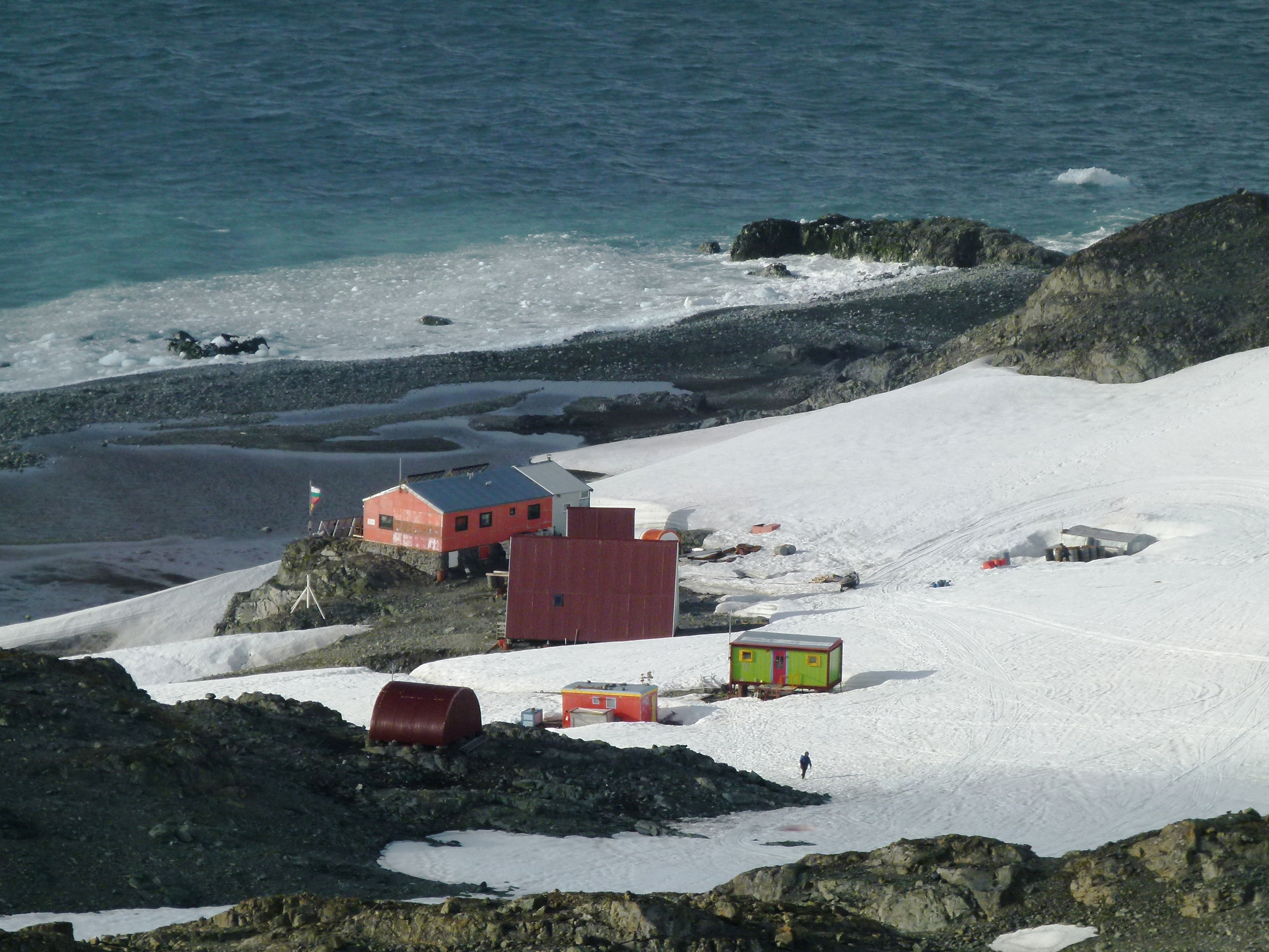
- The Bulgarian base in 2012, with the new St. Ivan Rilski Chapel in the foreground and Russian Hut, Lame Dog Hut (painted light green), the Laboratory, Casa España and the Main Building in the background

- Location of St. Kliment Ohridski Station in Antarctica
- Coordinates: 62°38′27″S 60°21′53″W
- Country: Bulgaria
- Location in Antarctica: Livingston Island; South Shetland Islands
- Administered by: Bulgarian Antarctic Institute
- Established: 29 April 1988
- Elevation: 15 m (49 ft)

Population (2017)
  - Summer: 22
  - Winter: 0
- Type: Seasonal
- Period: Summer
- Status: Operational
- Activities: List: Climatology; Geology; Geomorphology; Geophysics; Seismology; Topography
- Website: http://www.bai-bg.net

St. Kliment Ohridski Base (Bulgarian: База Св. Климент Охридски, romanized: Baza Sv. Kliment Ohridski, IPA: [ˈbazɐ svɛˈti ˈklimɛnt ˈɔxritski]) is a Bulgarian Antarctic base on Livingston Island in the South Shetland Islands.

The base, originally known as Sofia University Refuge or Hemus Base, was named in 1993 for medieval Bulgarian scholar St. Clement of Ohrid (840–916). The name is often shortened by non-Bulgarians to Ohridski Base, and sometimes misspelled as Ohridiski.

== Location ==
The base is located at an elevation of 12 to 15 m on Bulgarian Beach, 130 m inland from the shore of Emona Anchorage, between Pesyakov Hill and Sinemorets Hill, overlooking the Grand Lagoon. The base area is crossed by the melt-water Rezovski Creek in the summer, providing a water supply.

== History ==
Following an unsuccessful landing attempt at Cape Vostok on the northwestern extremity of Alexander Island, two prefabricated huts—the Lame Dog Hut and Russian Hut—were assembled on Livingston Island between 26 and 28 April 1988 by a four-member Bulgarian party supported logistically by the Soviet Research Ship Mikhail Somov under Captain Feliks Pesyakov. The facilities were later refurbished and inaugurated as a permanent base on 11 December 1993.

An expansion programme at St. Kliment Ohridski including the construction of a new multi-purpose building was carried out between 1996 and 1998. The St. Ivan Rilski Chapel built in 2003 is the first Eastern Orthodox edifice in Antarctica and the southernmost Eastern Orthodox building of worship in the world. A post office of the Bulgarian Posts has been in operation at St. Kliment Ohridski since 1994/1995.

The base is visited regularly by representatives of the institutions responsible for Bulgaria's activities in Antarctica, including President Georgi Parvanov of Bulgaria in January 2005.

== Description ==
Personnel and cargo from supply ships are offloaded by Zodiac boats at the southwestern extremity of the beach, 300 m away from the main base facilities. A designated helipad site is located on the northern side of the Grand Lagoon.

St. Kliment Ohridski is connected by several convenient overland routes leading from Bulgarian Beach to various internal and coastal areas of Livingston Island, including the Balkan Snowfield, Saedinenie Snowfield, Burdick Ridge, Pliska Ridge, Tangra Mountains, and the glaciers Perunika, Huntress, Huron, and Kaliakra. The Spanish base Juan Carlos I is situated 2.7 km to the south-southwest and is reached either by sea or by a 5.5 km route, while the central location of Camp Academia is 11 km due east in the Tangra Mountains.

The base is used by scientists from Bulgaria and other nations for research in the field of geology, biology, glaciology, topography and geographic information. St. Kliment Ohridski is visited by cruise ships from Hannah Point, one of the most popular tourist destinations in Antarctica situated but 12 km to the west. Lame Dog Hut, the 1988 principal building of the base (the oldest on the island since the renovation of the Spanish base started in 2009) hosts the Livingston Island Museum, a branch of the National Museum of History in Sofia since October 2012. The hut and its associated artefacts are considered part of the cultural and historic heritage of the island and Antarctica, designated a Historic Site or Monument of Antarctica. Under a joint Bulgarian-Mongolian project, a Monument to the Cyrillic Script was erected on Pesyakov Hill in March 2018.

== See also ==
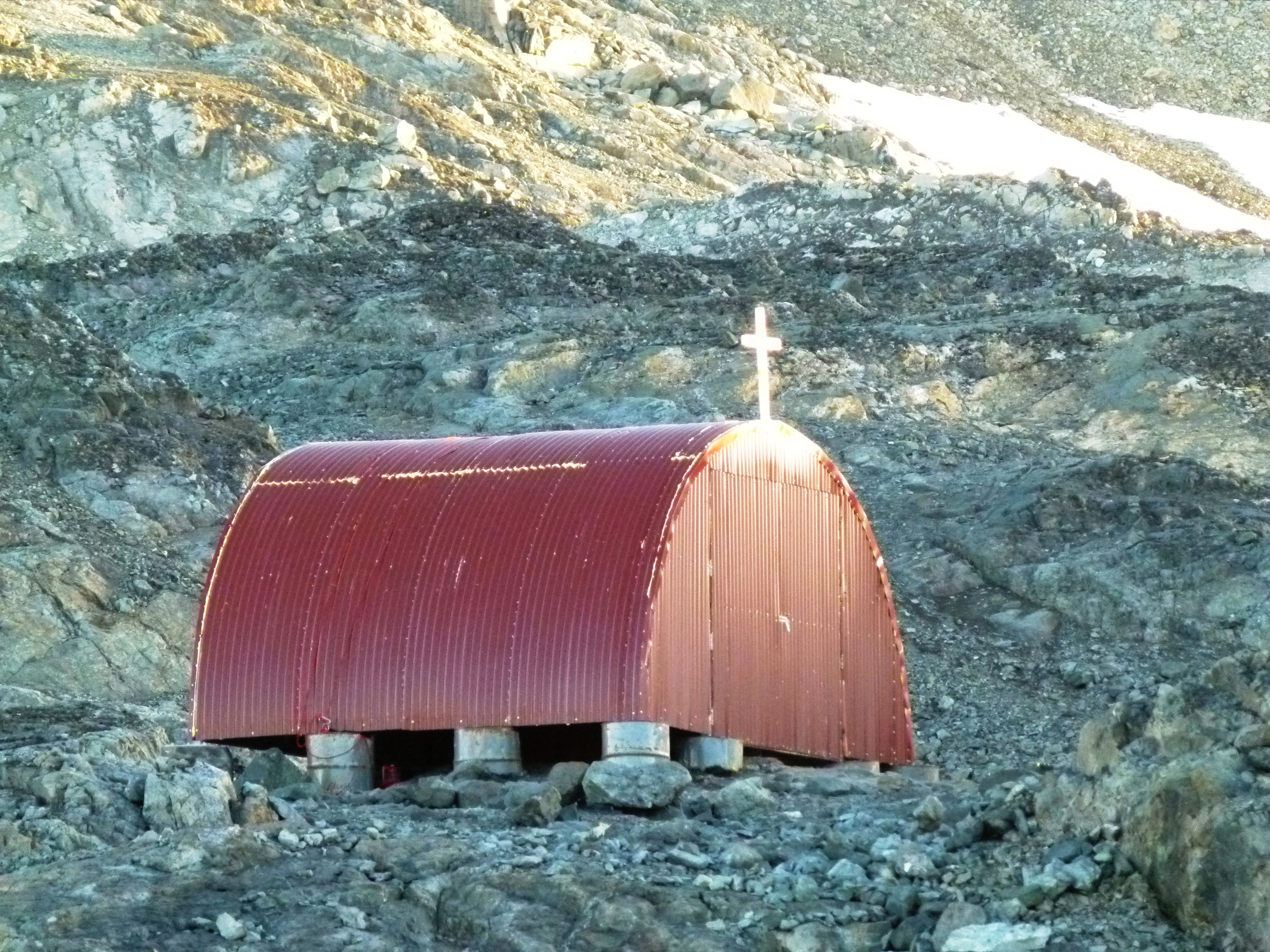
The chapel's new building in 2012

- List of Antarctic research stations
- List of Antarctic field camps
- Lame Dog Hut
- St. Ivan Rilski Chapel
- Bulgarian Antarctic Institute
- Camp Academia
- Livingston Island
- South Shetland Islands
- Antarctica
- Antarctic Place-names Commission
- Tangra 2004/05 Expedition
- Crime in Antarctica

== Maps ==
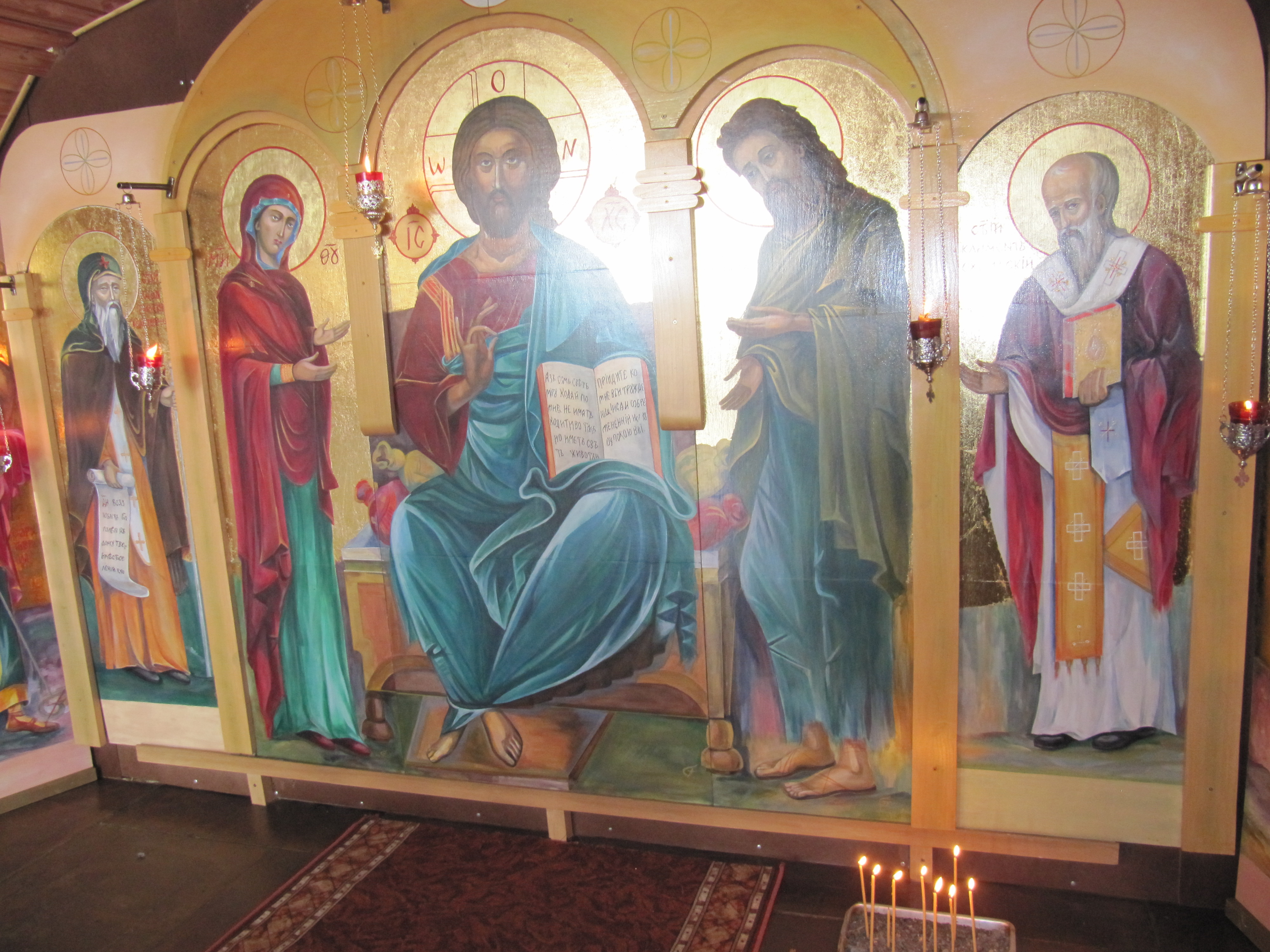
St. Ivan Rilski Chapel's altar

- Isla Livingston: Península Hurd. Mapa topográfico de escala 1:25 000. Madrid: Servicio Geográfico del Ejército, 1991.
- L.L. Ivanov. St. Kliment Ohridski Base, Livingston Island. Scale 1:1000 topographic map. Sofia: Antarctic Place-names Commission of Bulgaria, 1996. (The first Bulgarian Antarctic topographic map, in Bulgarian)
- L.L. Ivanov et al. Antarctica: Livingston Island and Greenwich Island, South Shetland Islands (from English Strait to Morton Strait, with illustrations and ice-cover distribution). Scale 1:100000 topographic map. Sofia: Antarctic Place-names Commission of Bulgaria, 2005.
- L.L. Ivanov. Antarctica: Livingston Island and Greenwich, Robert, Snow and Smith Islands. Scale 1:120000 topographic map. Troyan: Manfred Wörner Foundation, 2009. ISBN 978-954-92032-6-4
- Bulgarian Base (Sheet 1 and Sheet 2): Antarctica, South Shetland Islands, Livingston Island. Scale 1:2000 topographic map. Sofia: Military Geographic Service, 2016. (in Bulgarian, map images on slides 6 and 7 of the linked report)
- Antarctic Digital Database (ADD). Scale 1:250000 topographic map of Antarctica. Scientific Committee on Antarctic Research (SCAR). Since 1993, regularly upgraded and updated.
- L.L. Ivanov. Antarctica: Livingston Island and Smith Island. Scale 1:100000 topographic map. Manfred Wörner Foundation, 2017. ISBN 978-619-90008-3-0

== Gallery ==
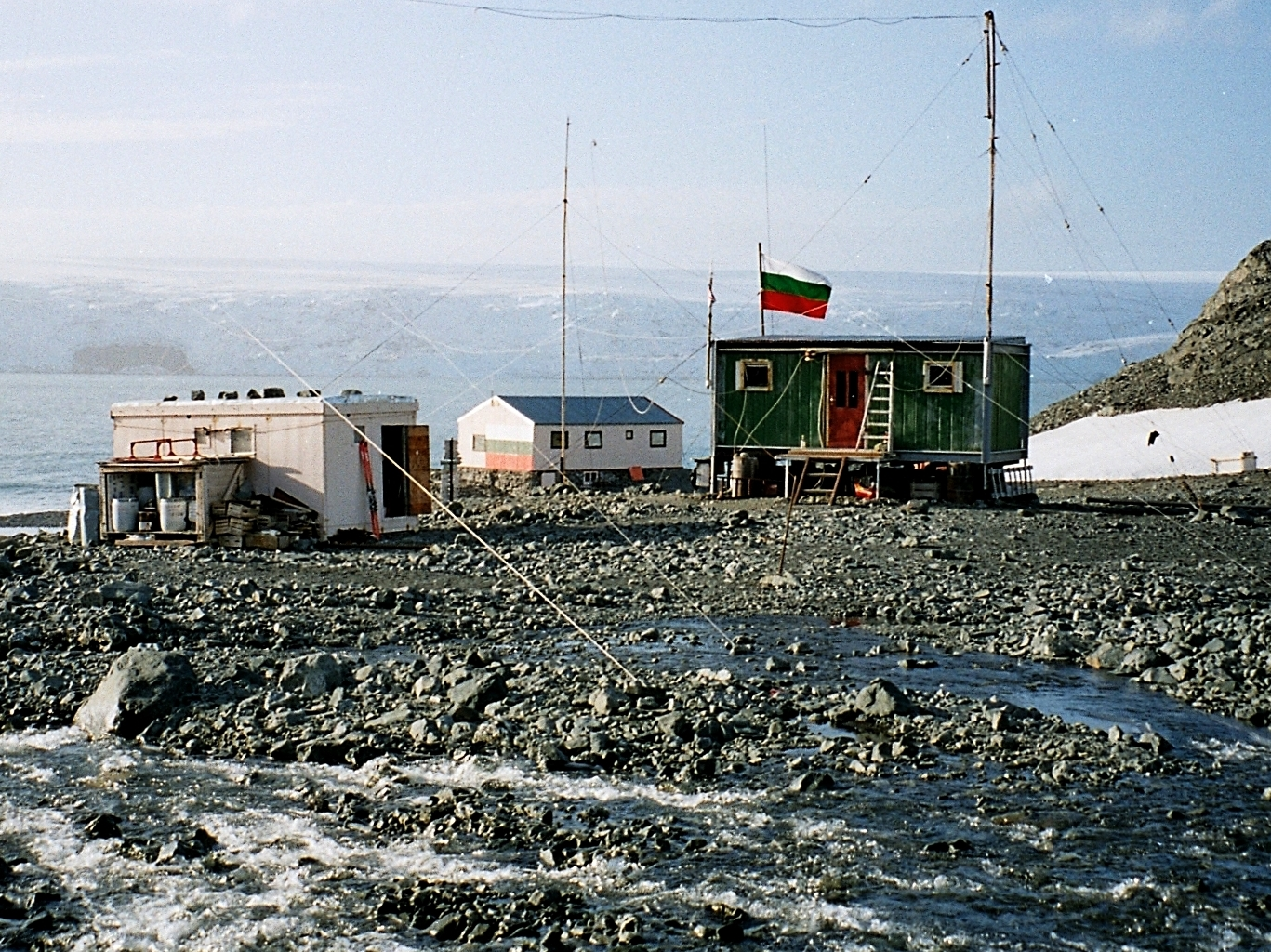
Bulgarian base in 2003

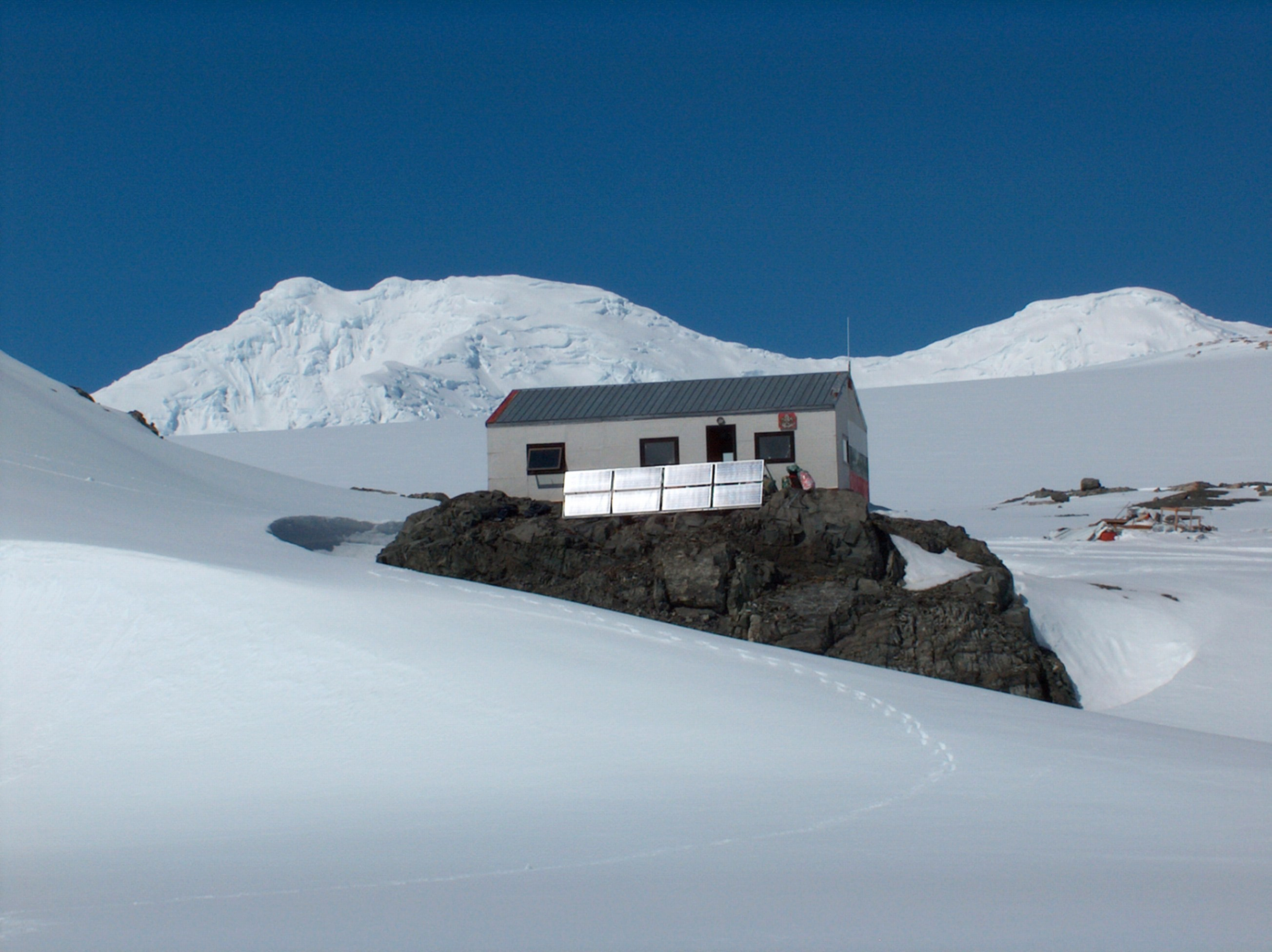
Main Building with Friesland Ridge in the background

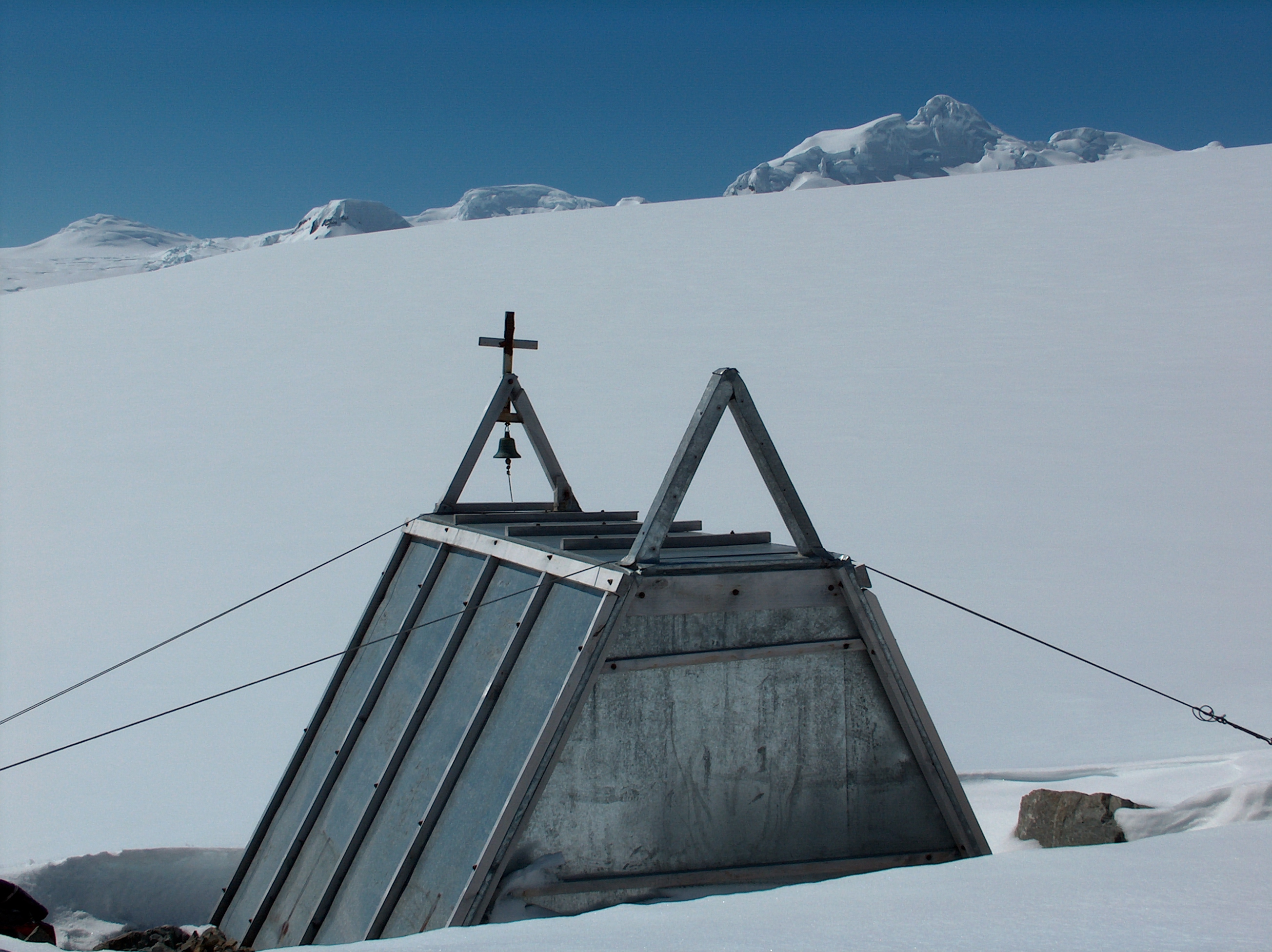
The old St. Ivan Rilski Chapel

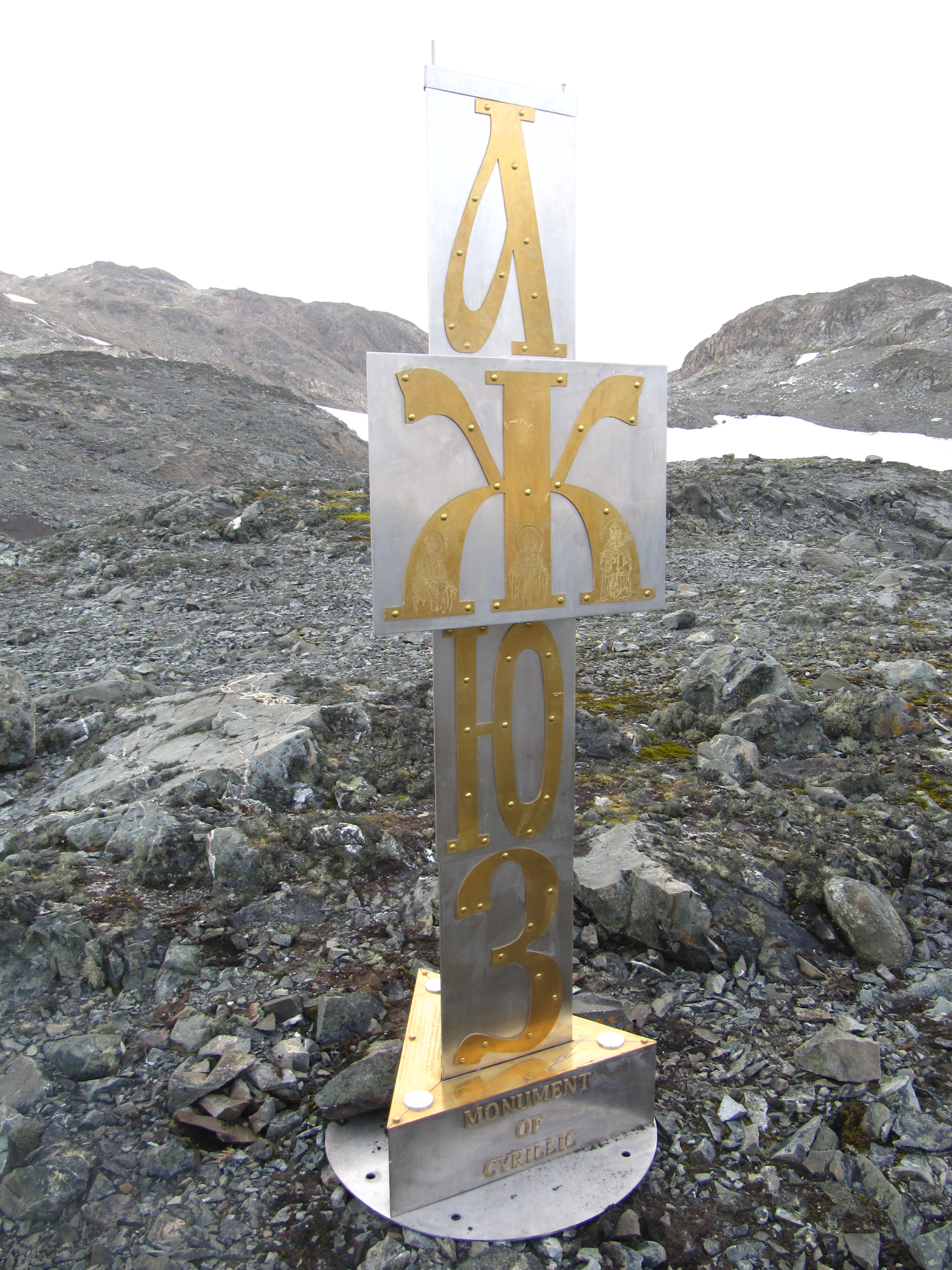
Cyrillic Script Monument

Topographic map of Livingston Island with the bases and base camps on the island

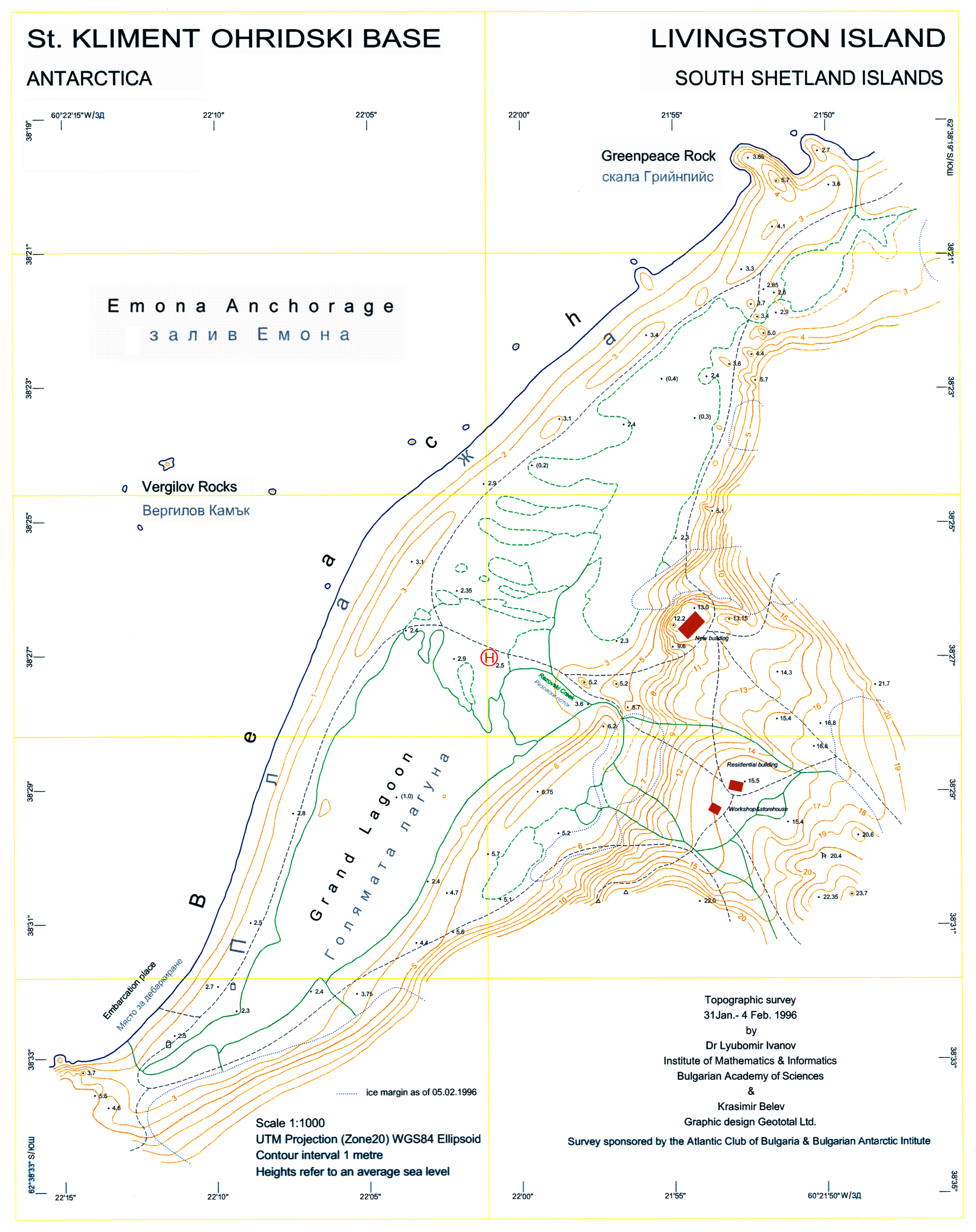
Base area and facilities in 1996

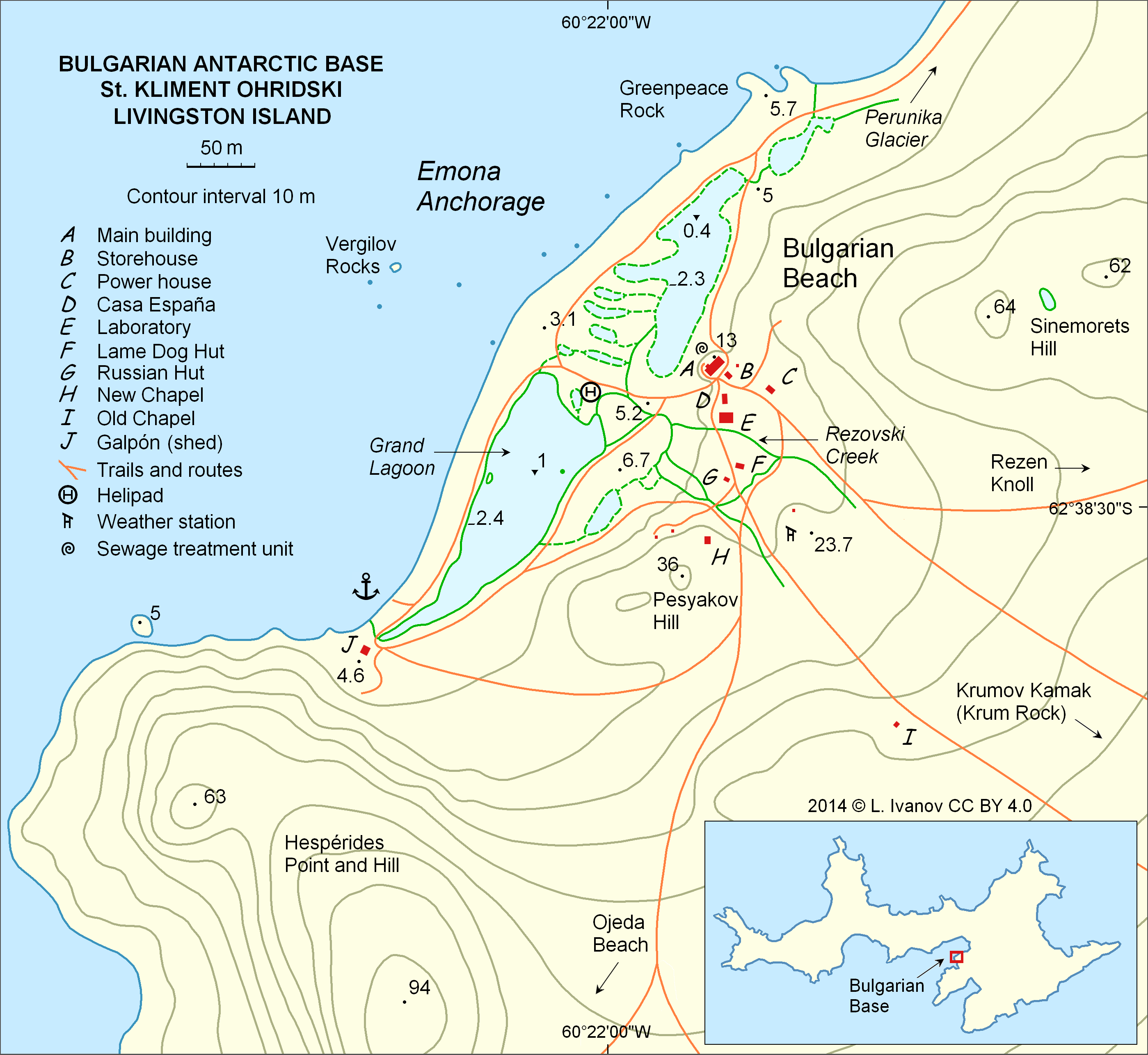
Base area and facilities in 2014

== Bibliography ==
- J. Stewart. Antarctica: An Encyclopedia. Jefferson, N.C. and London: McFarland, 2011. 1771 pp. ISBN 978-0-7864-3590-6
- L. Ivanov and N. Ivanova. St. Kliment Ohridski base. In: The World of Antarctica. Generis Publishing, 2022. pp. 158–162. ISBN 979-8-88676-403-1

This article includes information from the Antarctic Place-names Commission of Bulgaria which is used with permission.
