= National Centre of Polar Research (Bulgaria) =

Research unit of Sofia University

The National Center of Polar Research is a specialized body established by the Sofia University "St. Kliment Ohridski ", working together with Bulgarian Antarctic Institute in 2008 to appropriate the state budget funds allocated to polar scientific exploration, granted through the Ministry of Education and Science and the Ministry of Environment and Waters of Bulgaria.

== See also ==
- Bulgarian Antarctic Institute
- Antarctic Place-names Commission
