= Rezovski Creek =

Meltwater stream in Antarctica

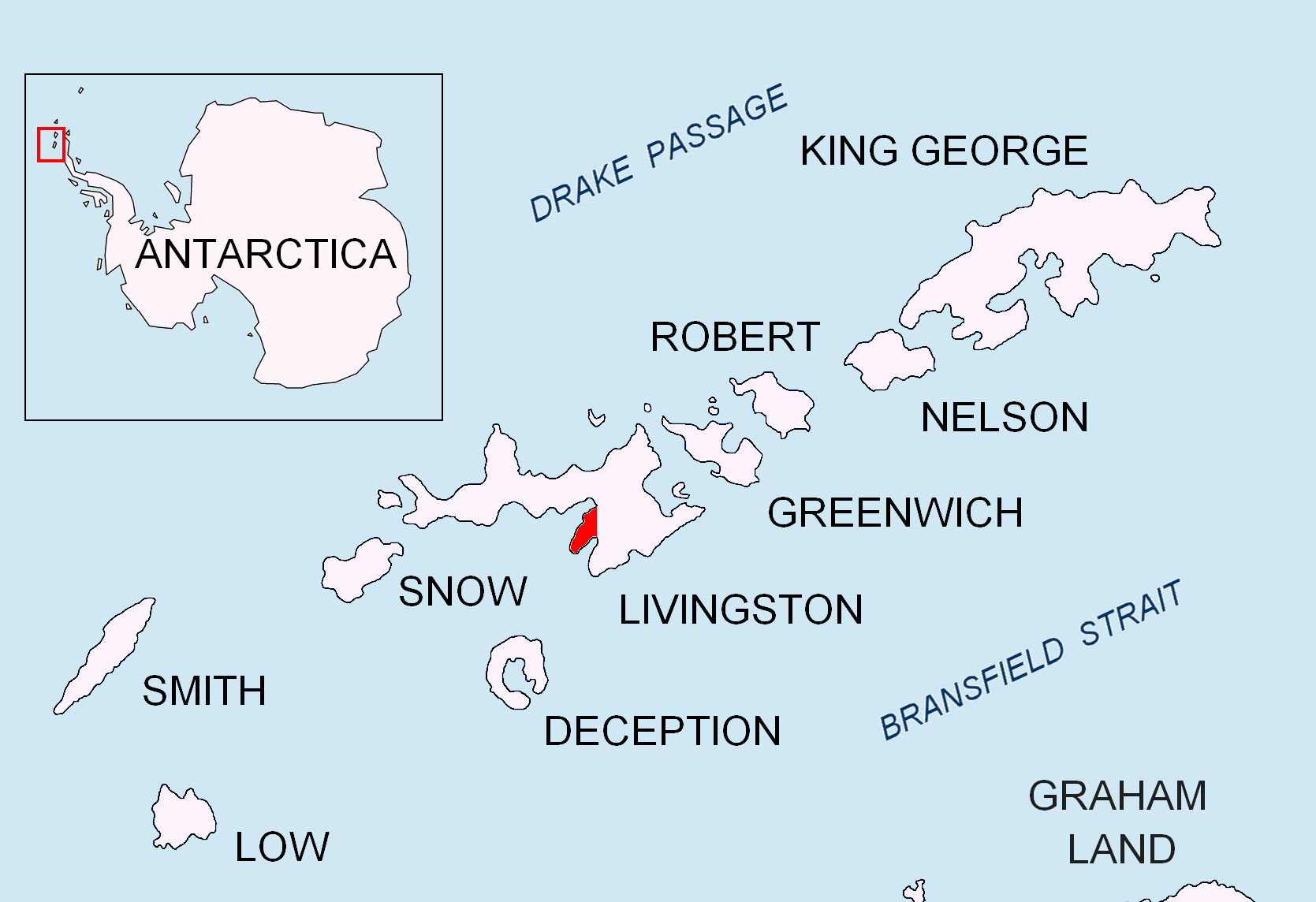
Location of Hurd Peninsula on Livingston Island in the South Shetland Islands

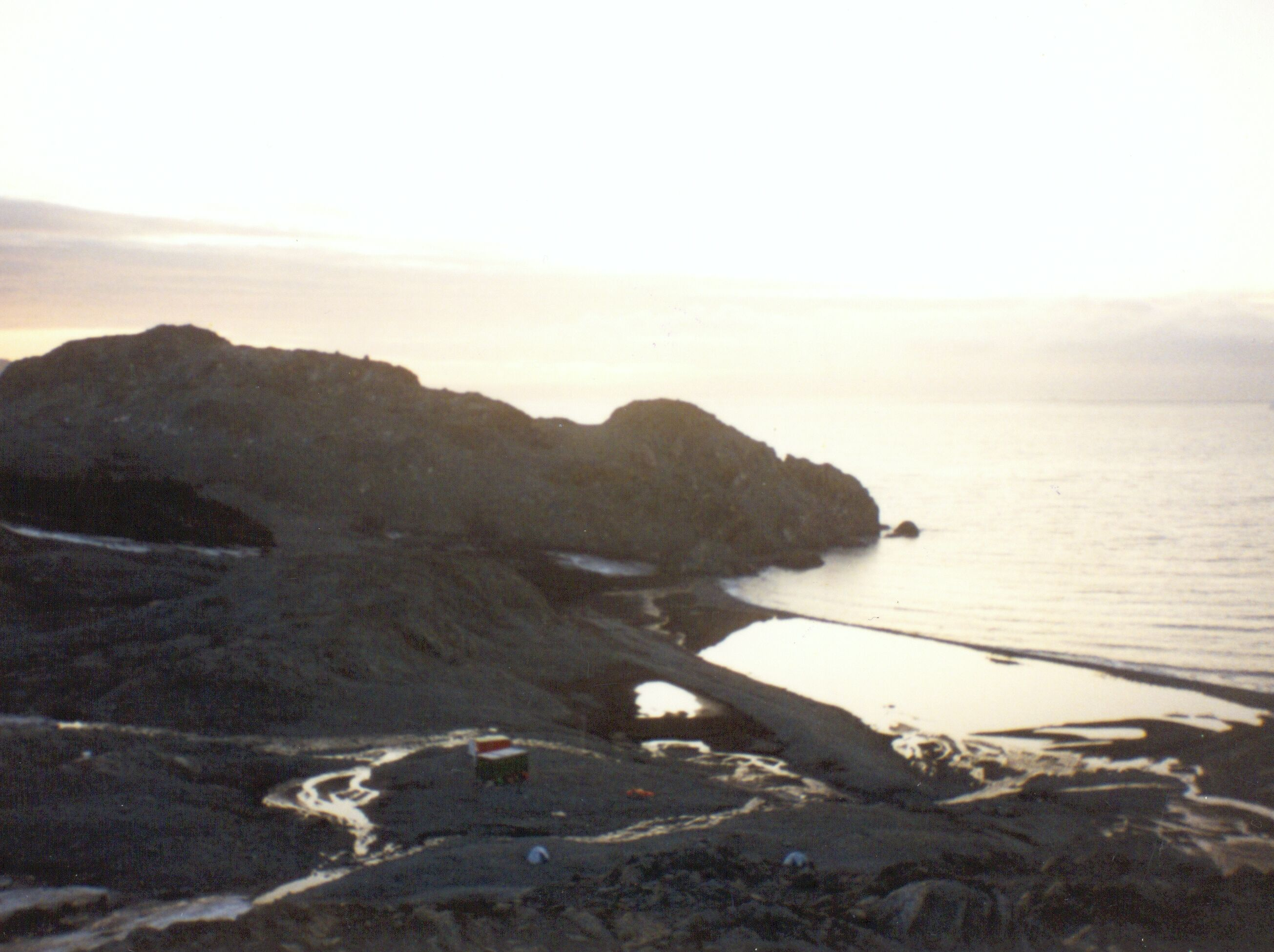
Rezovski Creek from Sinemorets Hill, with Hespérides Point in the background

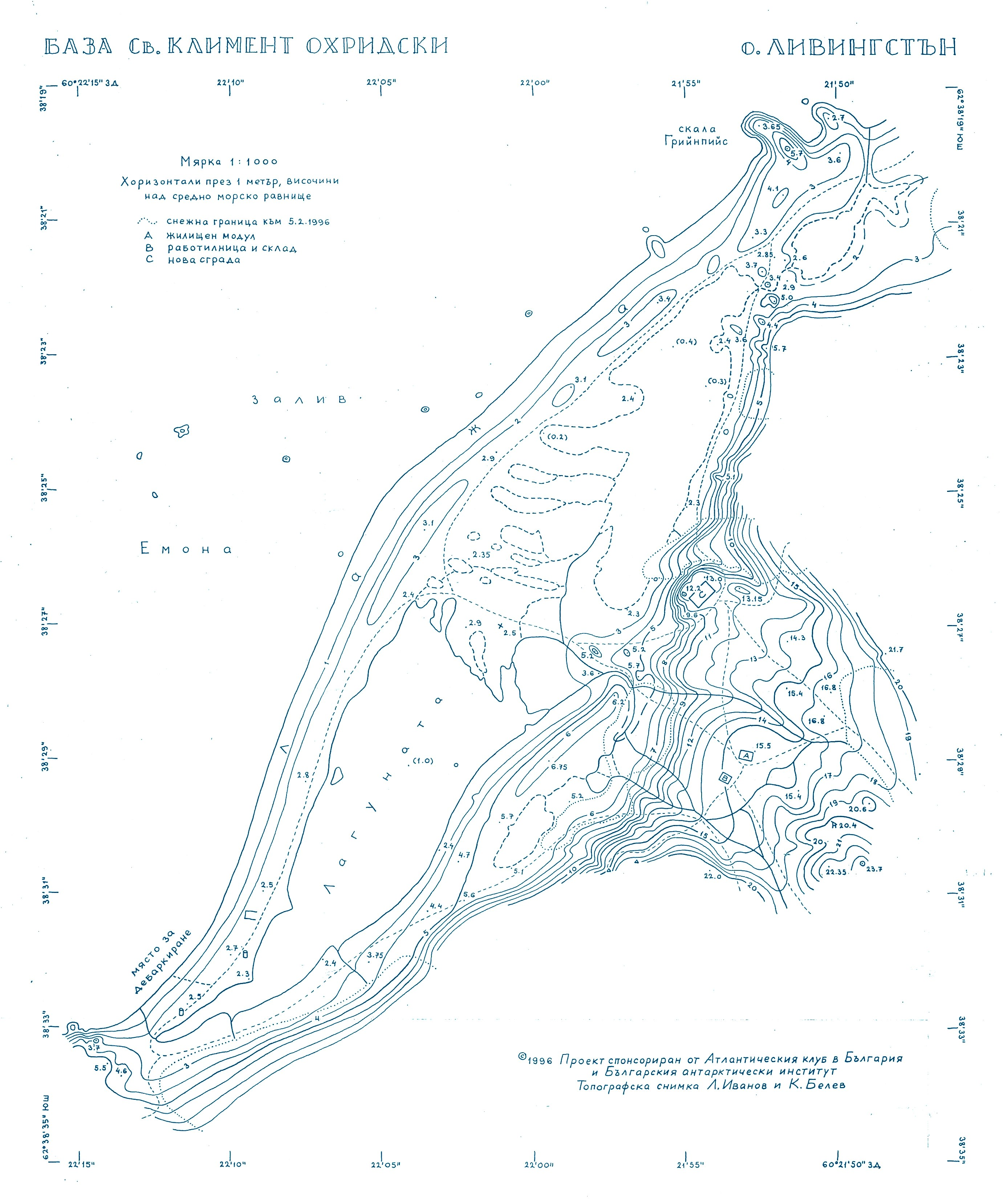
Topographic map of the Bulgarian Base area featuring Rezovski Creek

Topographic map of Livingston Island and Smith Island

Rezovski Creek (Bulgarian: Резовски поток \'re-zov-ski po-'tok\) is a meltwater stream located on Livingston Island, Antarctica.

The 500-metre-long (1,600 ft) stream drains that portion of the northwestern slope of the Balkan Snowfield between Hesperides Hill, Atlantic Club Ridge, Krum Rock and Sinemorets Hill on Hurd Peninsula in eastern Livingston Island, South Shetland Islands in Antarctica. The arms of Rezovski Creek encompass the old buildings of the Bulgarian Base. Its lower course forms Grand Lagoon, and it has its mouth at the southwest extremity of Bulgarian Beach, which is used as an embarkation place servicing St. Kliment Ohridski Base.

A name of national geography, Rezovska is a river in southeastern Bulgaria. The name was established in use at the time of approval.

== Location ==
The creek's midpoint is located at 62°38′28″S 60°21′57″W (Large scale Bulgarian mapping of the St. Kliment Ohridski Base vicinity from a topographic survey made from 31 January to 4 February 1996).

== Maps ==
- Isla Livingston: Península Hurd. Mapa topográfico de escala 1:25000. Madrid: Servicio Geográfico del Ejército, 1991. (Map reproduced on p. 16 of the linked work)
- L.L. Ivanov. St. Kliment Ohridski Base, Livingston Island. Scale 1:1000 topographic map. Sofia: Antarctic Place-names Commission of Bulgaria, 1996. (The first Bulgarian Antarctic topographic map, in Bulgarian)
- L.L. Ivanov et al. Antarctica: Livingston Island and Greenwich Island, South Shetland Islands. Scale 1:100000 topographic map. Sofia: Antarctic Place-names Commission of Bulgaria, 2005.
- L.L. Ivanov. Antarctica: Livingston Island and Greenwich, Robert, Snow and Smith Islands. Scale 1:120000 topographic map. Troyan: Manfred Wörner Foundation, 2009. ISBN 978-954-92032-6-4
- Bulgarian Base (Sheet 1 and Sheet 2): Antarctica, South Shetland Islands, Livingston Island. Scale 1:2000 topographic map. Sofia: Military Geographic Service, 2016. (in Bulgarian, map images on slides 6 and 7 of the linked report)
- Antarctic Digital Database (ADD). Scale 1:250000 topographic map of Antarctica. Scientific Committee on Antarctic Research (SCAR). Since 1993, regularly upgraded and updated.
- L.L. Ivanov. Antarctica: Livingston Island and Smith Island. Scale 1:100000 topographic map. Manfred Wörner Foundation, 2017. ISBN 978-619-90008-3-0
