= Pesyakov Hill =

Ice-free hill on Livingston Island, Antarctica

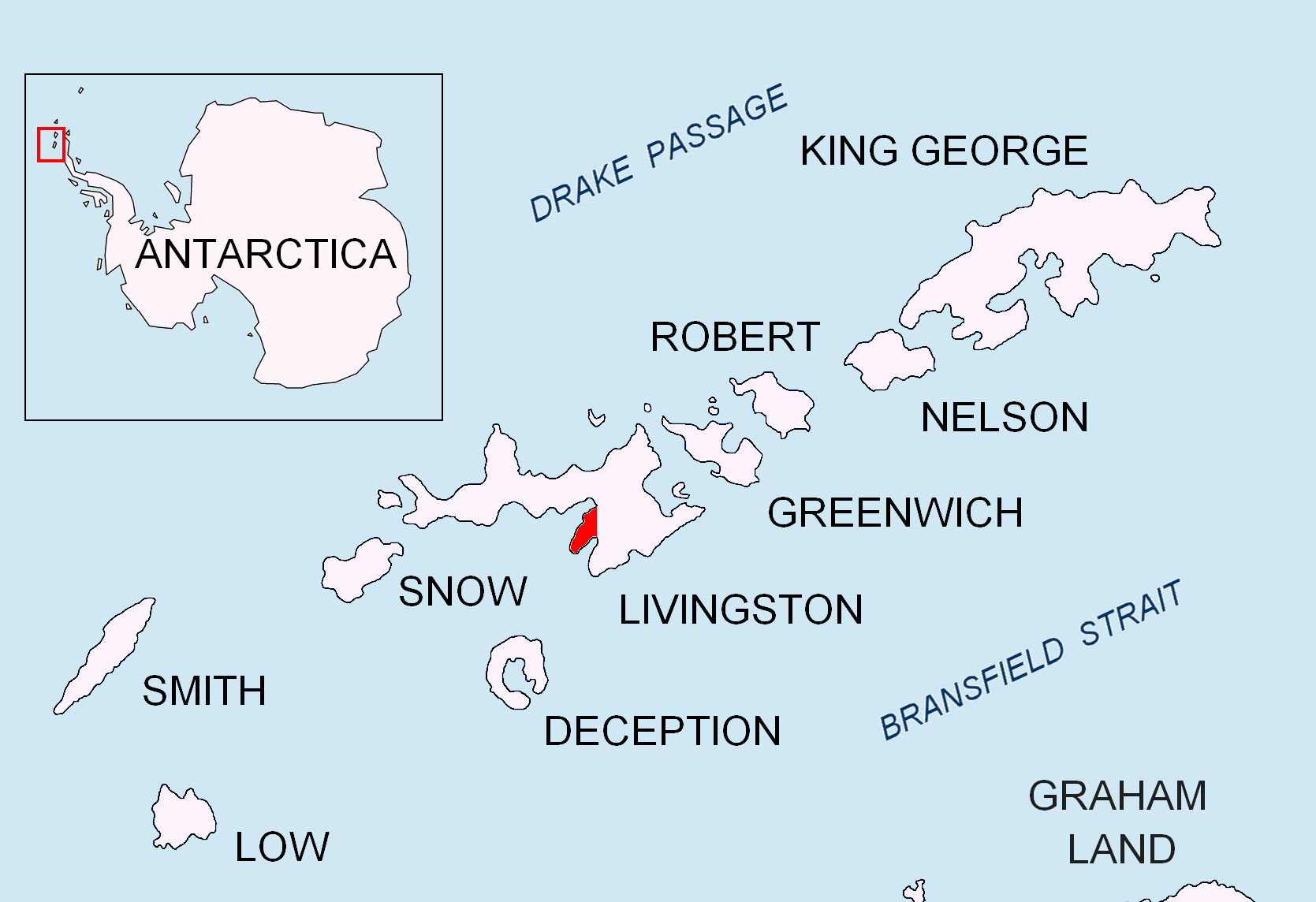
Location of Hurd Peninsula on Livingston Island in the South Shetland Islands.

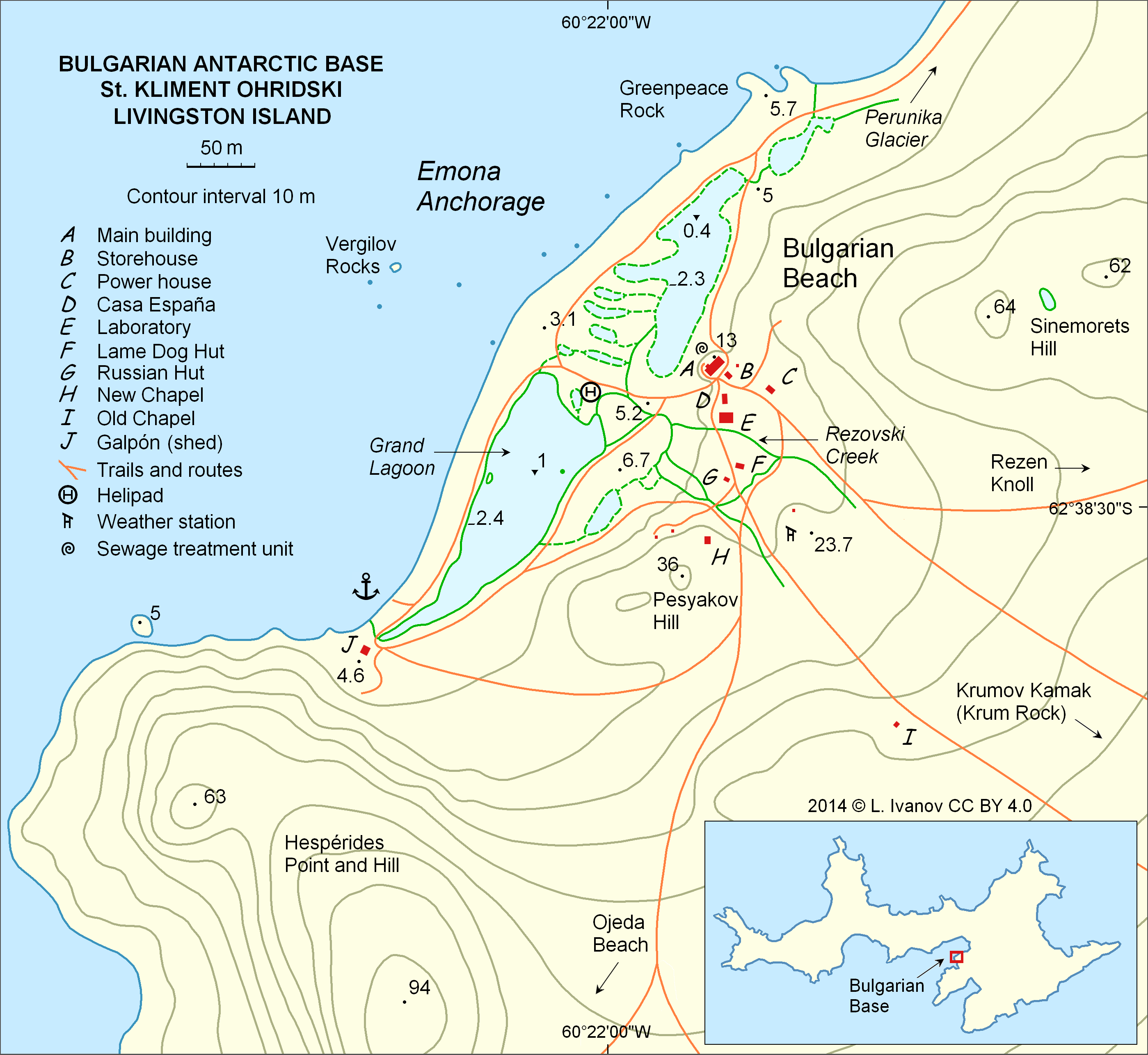
Topographic map of the Bulgarian Base area featuring Pesyakov Hill.

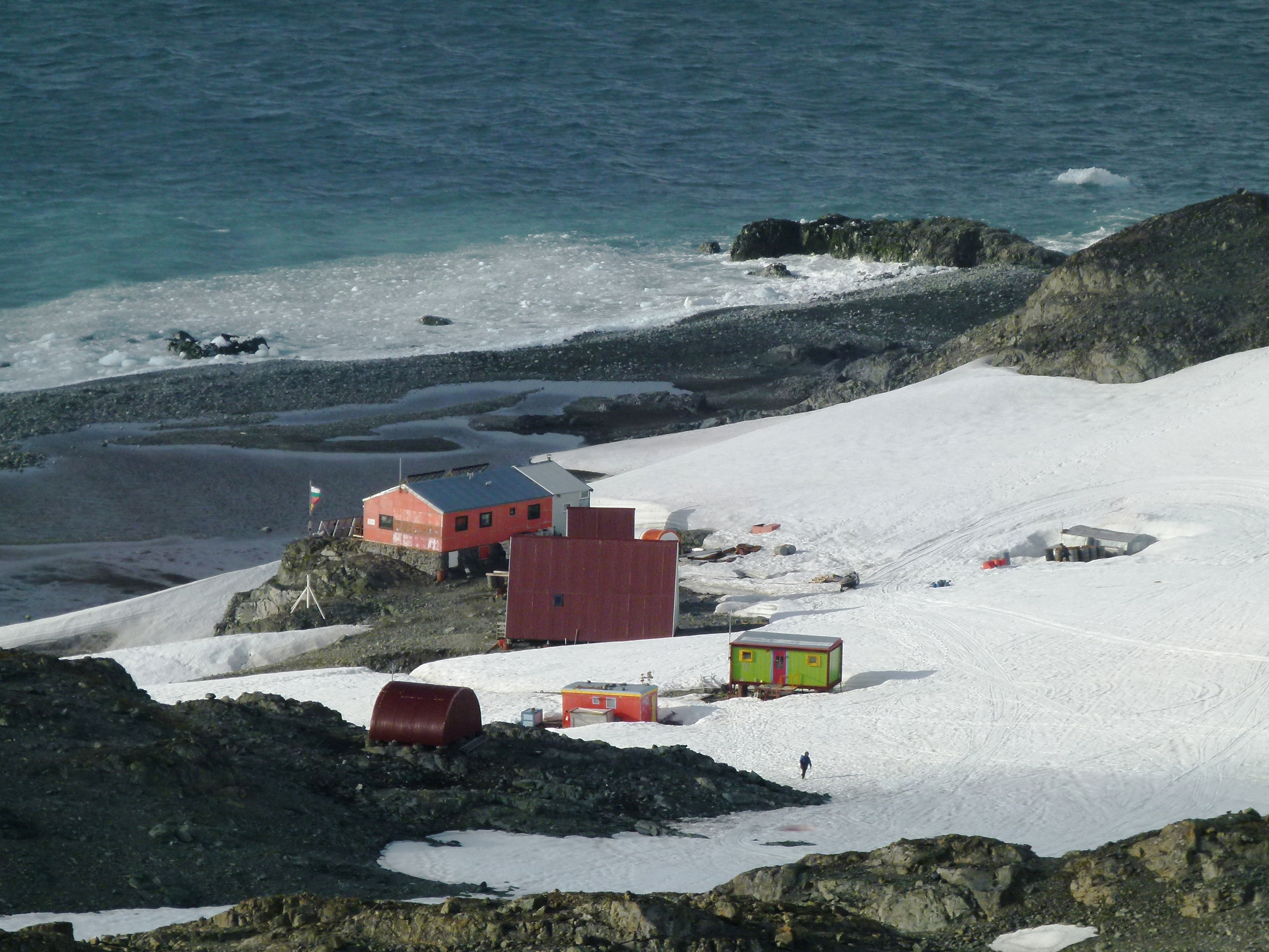
Bulgarian Antarctic base, with Pesyakov Hill on the left.

Topographic map of Livingston Island and Smith Island.

Pesyakov Hill (Bulgarian: Песяков хълм, ‘Pesyakov Halm’ \pe-sya-'kov 'h&lm\) is the ice-free hill rising to 36 m next south-southwest of the 1988 buildings of St. Kliment Ohridski Base on Bulgarian Beach, Hurd Peninsula on Livingston Island in the South Shetland Islands, Antarctica. Surmounting Grand Lagoon to the west and southwest. Access to the hill is restricted to protect floral communities.

The hill is named after Captain Feliks Pesyakov whose vessel, the Soviet Research Ship Mihail Somov, provided logistic support for building the first facilities of the Bulgarian Antarctic base in April 1988.

== Location ==
Pesyakov Hill is located at 62°38′31″S 60°21′56″W, which is 490 m northeast of Hespérides Point and 270 m southwest of Sinemorets Hill. Spanish mapping in 1991, and Bulgarian in 1996.

== Maps ==
- Isla Livingston: Península Hurd. Mapa topográfico de escala 1:25000. Madrid: Servicio Geográfico del Ejército, 1991. (Map reproduced on p. 16 of the linked work)
- L.L. Ivanov. Livingston Island: Central-Eastern Region. Scale 1:25000 topographic map. Sofia: Antarctic Place-names Commission of Bulgaria, 1996.
- Antarctica, South Shetland Islands, Livingston Island: Bulgarian Antarctic Base. Sheets 1 and 2. Scale 1:2000 topographic map. Geodesy, Cartography and Cadastre Agency, 2016. (in Bulgarian)
- Antarctic Digital Database (ADD). Scale 1:250000 topographic map of Antarctica. Scientific Committee on Antarctic Research (SCAR). Since 1993, regularly upgraded and updated.
- L.L. Ivanov. Antarctica: Livingston Island and Smith Island. Scale 1:100000 topographic map. Manfred Wörner Foundation, 2017. ISBN 978-619-90008-3-0
