= Bulgarian Antarctic Institute =

National Antarctic operator of Bulgaria

Bulgarian Antarctic Institute is the national Antarctic operator of Bulgaria, organizing annual Antarctic campaigns and maintaining the Bulgarian Antarctic base of St. Kliment Ohridski on Livingston Island in the South Shetland Islands.

== History ==
Bulgarians were members of Soviet Antarctic expeditions since 1960s. Bulgaria has been a member of the Antarctic Treaty since 1978. Since the collapse of Communism Bulgaria intensified its research in Antarctica. As of 2024, there are 1,367 Bulgarian toponyms in Antarctica.

== Operation ==
The institute was established in 1993, and comprises several dozens individual members and few institutional ones: the Bulgarian Ministry of Foreign Affairs, Sofia University St. Kliment Ohridski , Sofia Medical University, and the Atlantic Club of Bulgaria. Founding Chairman of the institute is Christo Pimpirev.

The Institute cooperates in Antarctic logistics and research projects with the Antarctic Programs of Spain, United Kingdom, Russia, Germany, Argentina, Brazil, Chile, South Korea etc. The Bulgarian Antarctic Institute is a member of the Council of Managers of National Antarctic Programs (COMNAP), the Standing Committee on Antarctic Logistics and Operations (SCALOP), the European Polar Board, and the Scientific Committee on Antarctic Research (SCAR).

== See also ==
- National Centre of Polar Research
- Antarctic Place-names Commission
- St. Kliment Ohridski Base

== Bibliography ==
- J. Stewart. Antarctica: An Encyclopedia. Jefferson, N.C. and London: McFarland, 2011. 1771 pp. ISBN 978-0-7864-3590-6
