= Sinemorets Hill =

Hill in the South Shetland Islands, Antarctica

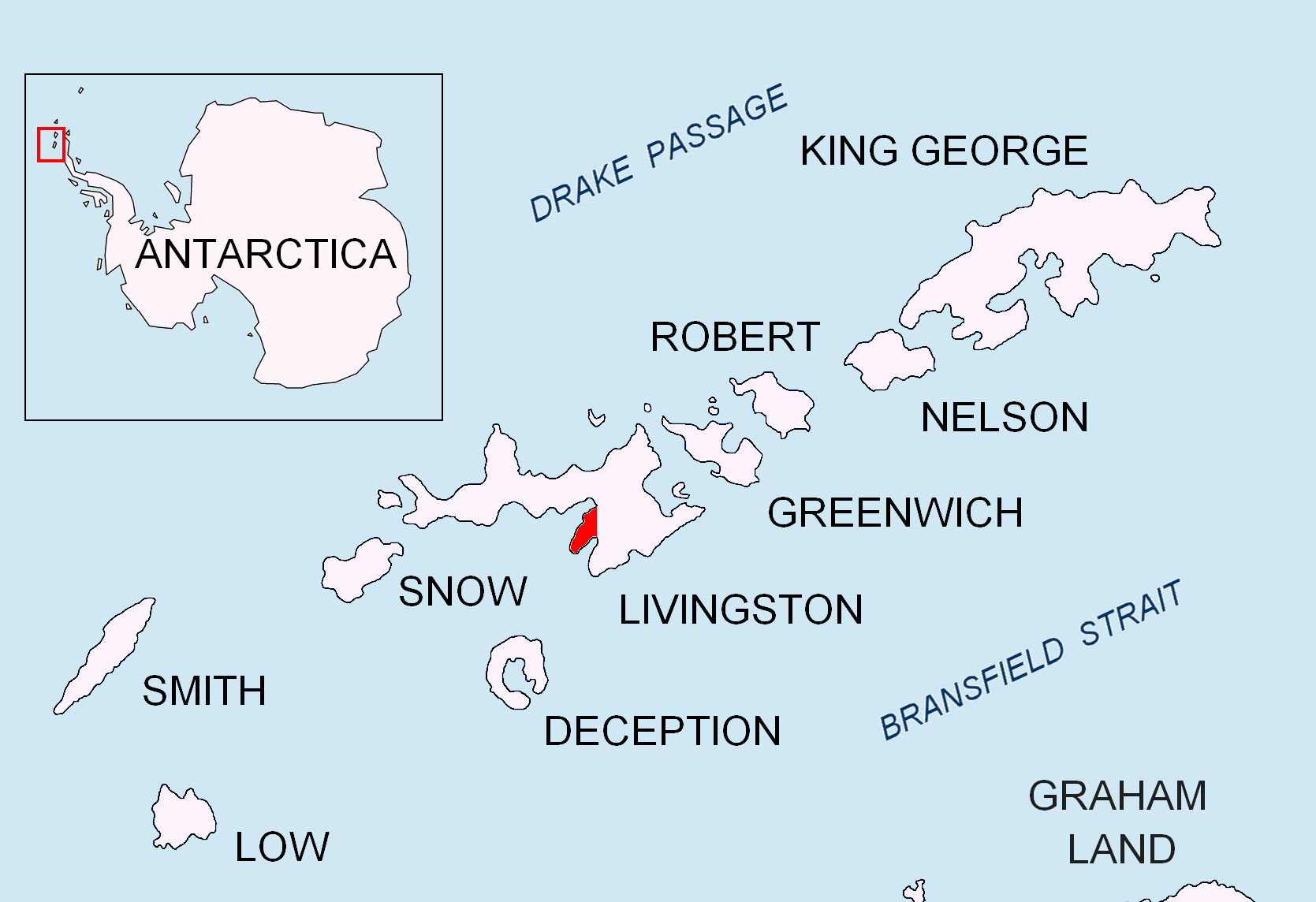
Location of Hurd Peninsula on Livingston Island in the South Shetland Islands.

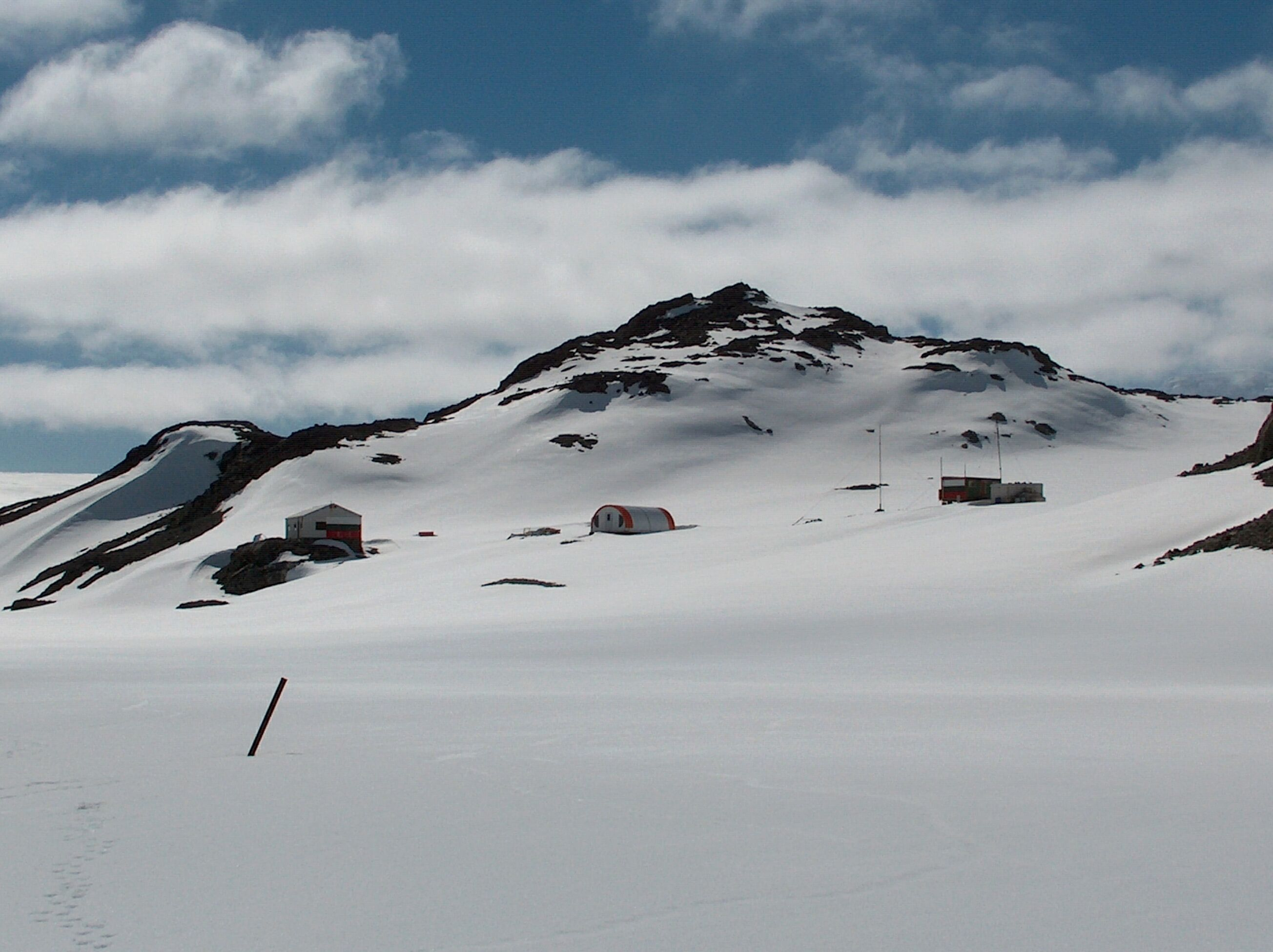
Sinemorest Hill with St. Kliment Ohridski Base in its foothills, and snow-covered Grand Lagoon in the foreground.

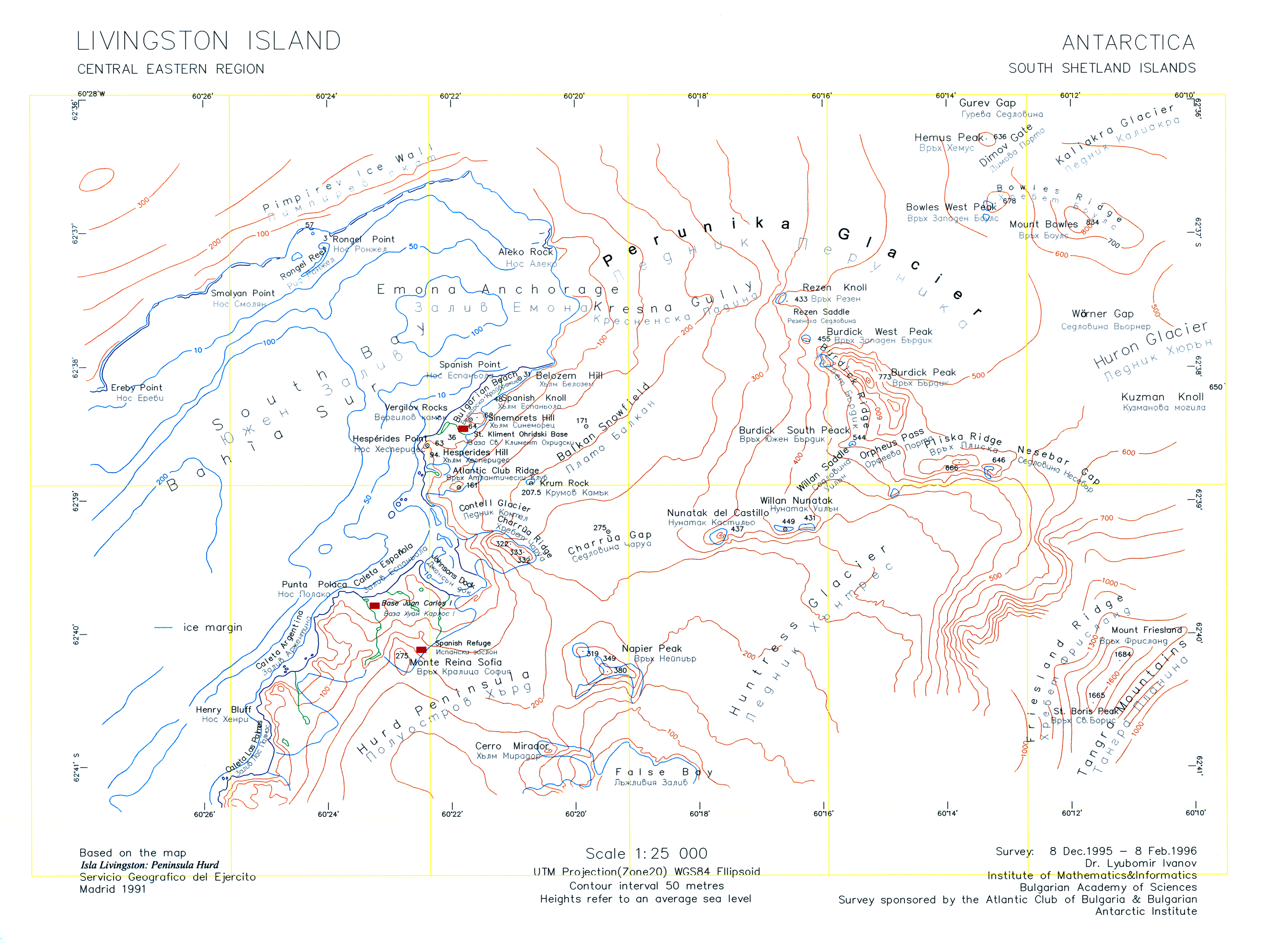
Topographic map of central-eastern Livingston Island featuring Sinemorets Hill.

Topographic map of Livingston Island and Smith Island

Sinemorets Hill (Halm Sinemorets \'h&lm si-ne-'mo-rets\) is the second most prominent (after Hesperides Hill) in the chain of hills surmounting Bulgarian Beach in eastern Livingston Island in the South Shetland Islands, Antarctica.

Sinemorets Hill is 380 m long in east-west direction and 230 m wide, with twin heights, the west-southwestern one being 64 m and the east-northeastern one 62 m, sheltering a small pool between them. It is snow free in the summer months and overlooks the Bulgarian base to the southwest. Relics of an old encampment were still discernible at its eastern slope in 1996.

Sinemorets is the name of a village and a cape on the Black Sea coast. The hill was named by the United Kingdom Antarctic Place-Names Committee (UK-APC) in 1994 at the request of the Second Bulgarian Antarctic Expedition (1993/94).

== Location ==
The peak is located at 62°38′25″S 60°21′42″W, which is 820 m east-northeast of Hespérides Point, 220 m inland from Greenpeace Rock, 1.2 km northwest of Krum Rock and 970 m north-northeast of Atlantic Club Ridge. Mapped in detail by the Spanish Servicio Geográfico del Ejército in 1991, Bulgarian mapping in 1996, 2005 and 2009. Co-ordinates, elevation and distances given according to a 1995–96 Bulgarian topographic survey.

== Maps ==
- Isla Livingston: Península Hurd. Mapa topográfico de escala 1:25000. Madrid: Servicio Geográfico del Ejército, 1991. (Map reproduced on p. 16 of the linked work)
- L.L. Ivanov. Livingston Island: Central-Eastern Region. Scale 1:25000 topographic map. Sofia: Antarctic Place-names Commission of Bulgaria, 1996.
- L.L. Ivanov et al. Antarctica: Livingston Island and Greenwich Island, South Shetland Islands. Scale 1:100000 topographic map. Sofia: Antarctic Place-names Commission of Bulgaria, 2005.
- L.L. Ivanov. Antarctica: Livingston Island and Greenwich, Robert, Snow and Smith Islands. Scale 1:120000 topographic map. Troyan: Manfred Wörner Foundation, 2009. ISBN 978-954-92032-6-4
- Bulgarian Base (Sheet 1 and Sheet 2): Antarctica, South Shetland Islands, Livingston Island. Scale 1:2000 topographic map. Sofia: Military Geographic Service, 2016. (in Bulgarian, map images on slides 6 and 7 of the linked report)
- L.L. Ivanov. Antarctica: Livingston Island and Smith Island. Scale 1:100000 topographic map. Manfred Wörner Foundation, 2017. ISBN 978-619-90008-3-0
