= Grand Lagoon =

Lagoon in Antarctica

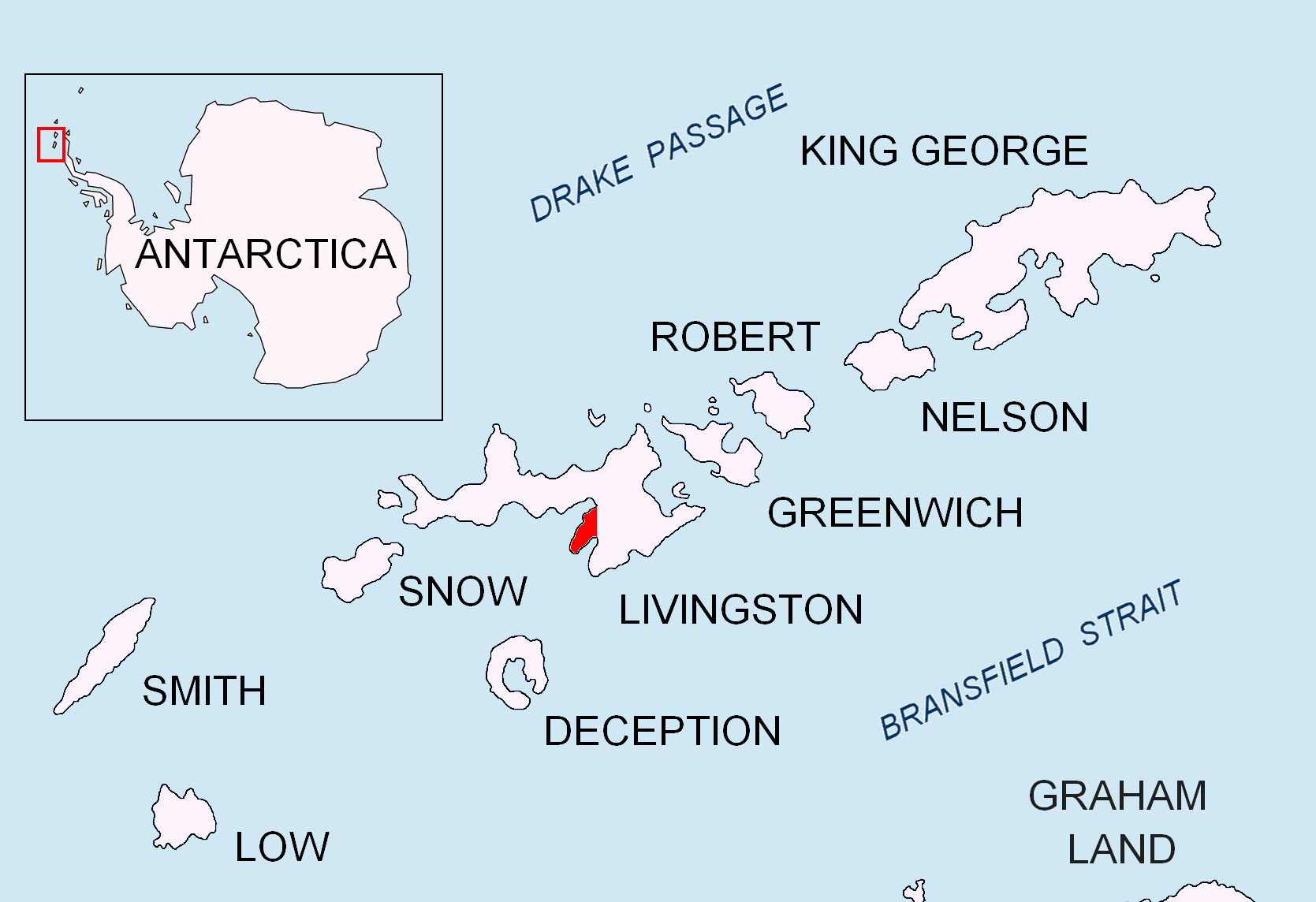
Location of Hurd Peninsula on Livingston Island in the South Shetland Islands.

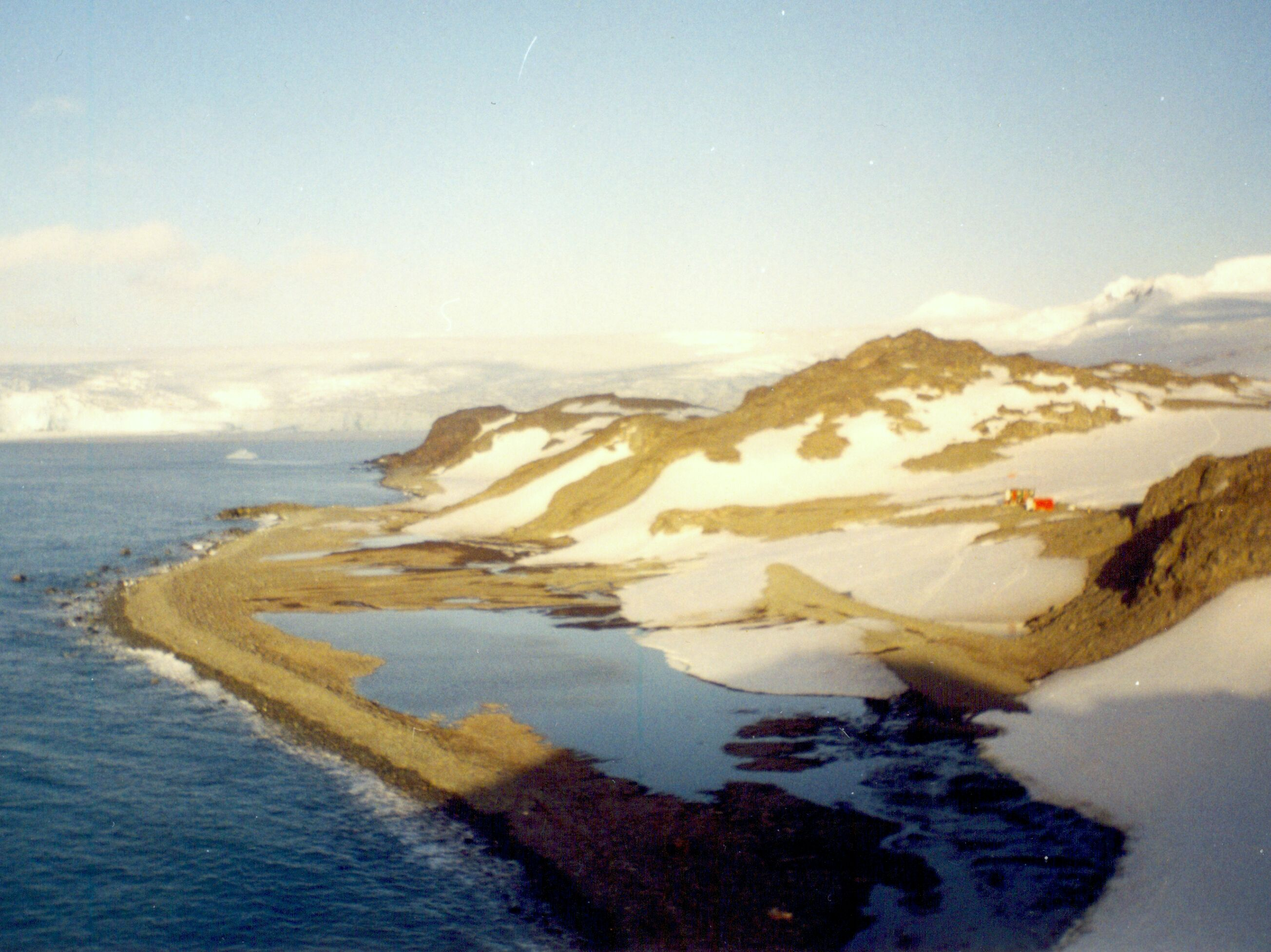
Grand Lagoon from Hesperides Hill.

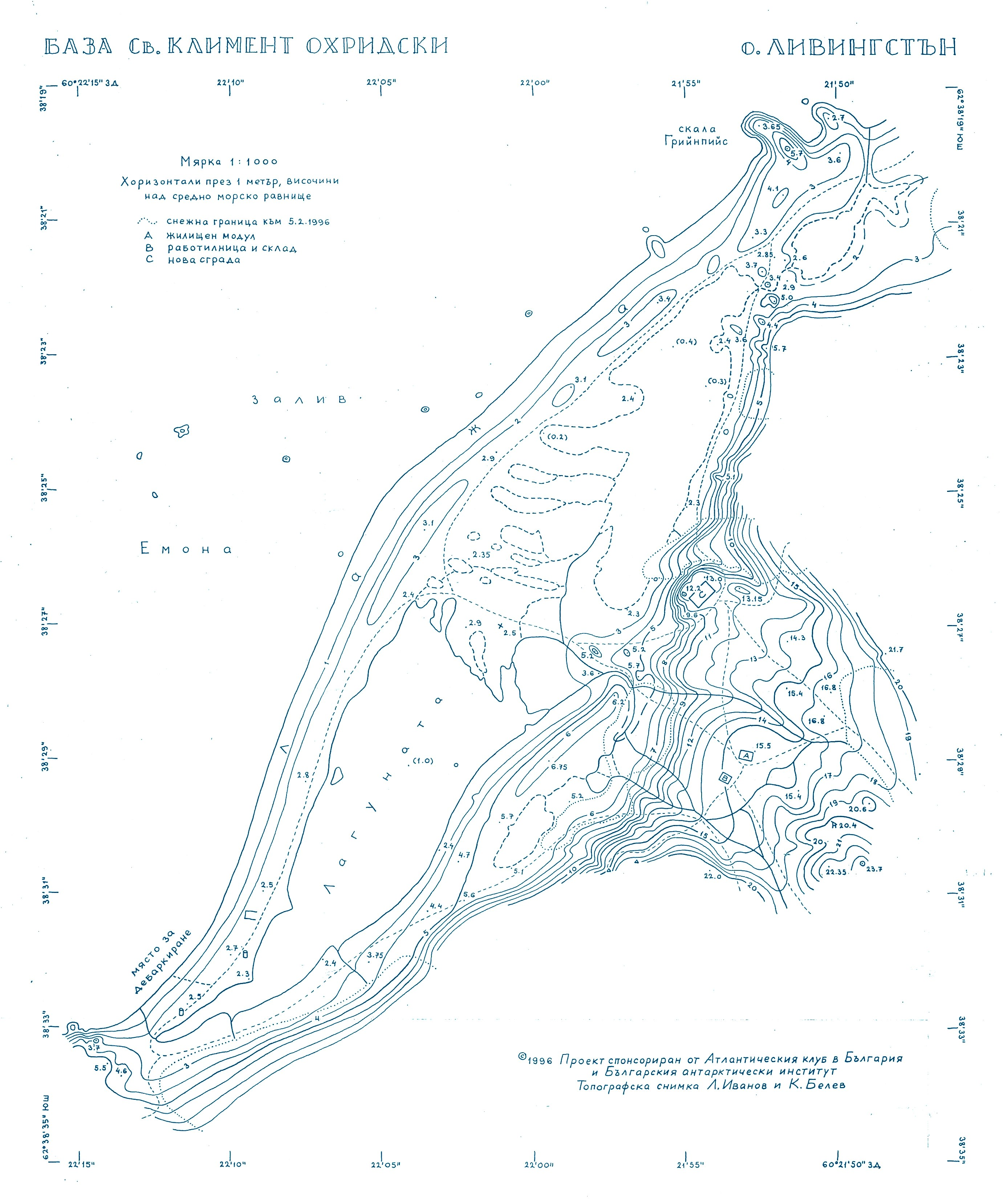
Topographic map of the Bulgarian Base area featuring Grand Lagoon.

Topographic map of Livingston Island and Smith Island.

Grand Lagoon (Bulgarian: Голямата лагуна, romanized: Golyamata Laguna, IPA: [ɡoˈʎamɐtɐ ɫɐˈɡunɐ]) is a 1-hectare (2.5-acre) freshwater lagoon of elevation 2.4 metres (7.9 ft) on Bulgarian Beach, Hurd Peninsula in eastern Livingston Island, in the South Shetland Islands, Antarctica. Formed by Rezovski Creek and separated from sea by a moraine of elevation near 3 metres (9.8 ft). Surmounted by Pesyakov Hill. On the northeast side of the lagoon is the helipad of the Bulgarian base, and on its southwest side — the designated embarkation area and a shed hosting the base's Zodiac inflatable boats. A descriptive name, established in use at the time of approval.

== Location ==
The midpoint of the lagoon is located at 62°38′30″S 60°22′05″W. Bulgarian mapping from a ground survey accomplished during the austral summer of 1995–96.

== Maps ==
- L.L. Ivanov. St. Kliment Ohridski Base, Livingston Island. Scale 1:1000 topographic map. Sofia: Antarctic Place-names Commission of Bulgaria, 1996. (The first Bulgarian Antarctic topographic map, in Bulgarian)
- L.L. Ivanov. Livingston Island: Central-Eastern Region. Scale 1:25000 topographic map. Sofia: Antarctic Place-names Commission of Bulgaria, 1996.
- L.L. Ivanov. Antarctica: Livingston Island and Greenwich, Robert, Snow and Smith Islands. Scale 1:120000 topographic map. Troyan: Manfred Wörner Foundation, 2009.
- Bulgarian Base (Sheet 1 and Sheet 2): Antarctica, South Shetland Islands, Livingston Island. Scale 1:2000 topographic map. Sofia: Military Geographic Service, 2016. (in Bulgarian, map images on slides 6 and 7 of the linked report)
- L.L. Ivanov. Antarctica: Livingston Island and Smith Island. Scale 1:100000 topographic map. Manfred Wörner Foundation, 2017. ISBN 978-619-90008-3-0
