= Half Moon Beach =

Beach in Antarctica

Coordinates: 62°28′49″S 60°46′40″W

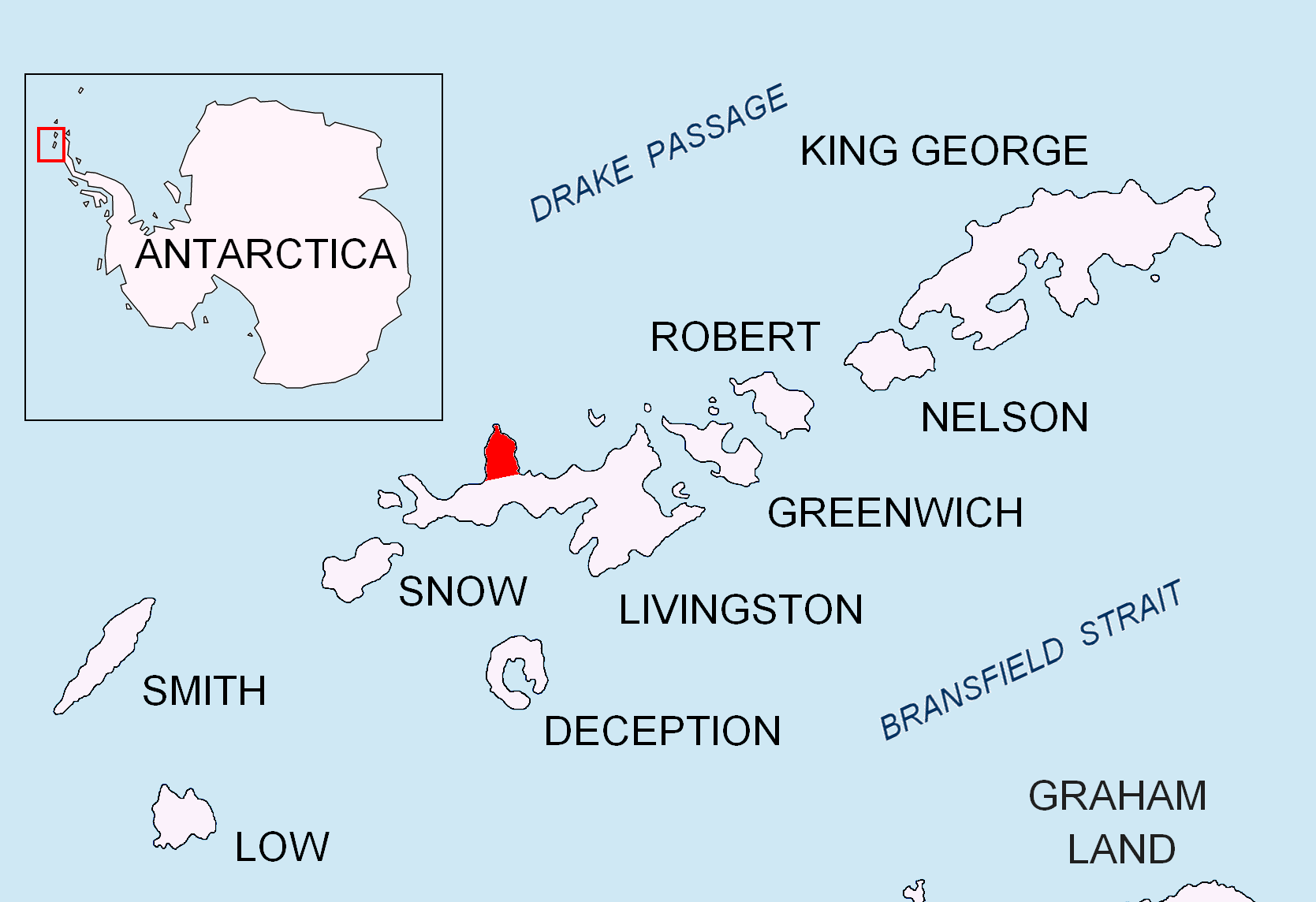
Location of Ioannes Paulus II Peninsula on Livingston Island in the South Shetland Islands

Half Moon Beach is a small crescent-shaped beach lying 1 nautical mile (2 km) south-east of Scarborough Castle on the north coast of Livingston Island, in the South Shetland Islands of Antarctica. The beach lies at the western extremity of Porlier Bay in the north of Ioannes Paulus II Peninsula.

== History ==
The descriptive name was recorded by Robert Fildes, who had sealers working here in 1820–21 and 1821–22. Wreckage of the Spanish ship San Telmo that sank off the island in 1819 was subsequently found on the beach.

== Historic site ==
A cairn at the beach, along with a plaque on ‘Cerro Gaviota’ opposite San Telmo Island, commemorates the officers, soldiers and seamen aboard the San Telmo, who were possibly the first people to live and die in Antarctica. It has been designated a Historic Site or Monument San Telmo Cairn (HSM 59), following a proposal by Chile, Spain and Peru to the Antarctic Treaty Consultative Meeting.

== Maps ==
Topographic map of Livingston Island, Greenwich, Robert, Snow and Smith Islands.

- L.L. Ivanov et al. Antarctica: Livingston Island and Greenwich Island, South Shetland Islands. Scale 1:100000 topographic map. Sofia: Antarctic Place-names Commission of Bulgaria, 2005.
- L.L. Ivanov. Antarctica: Livingston Island and Greenwich, Robert, Snow and Smith Islands. Scale 1:120000 topographic map. Troyan: Manfred Wörner Foundation, 2010. ISBN 978-954-92032-9-5 (First edition 2009. ISBN 978-954-92032-6-4)
