= Toqui Hill =

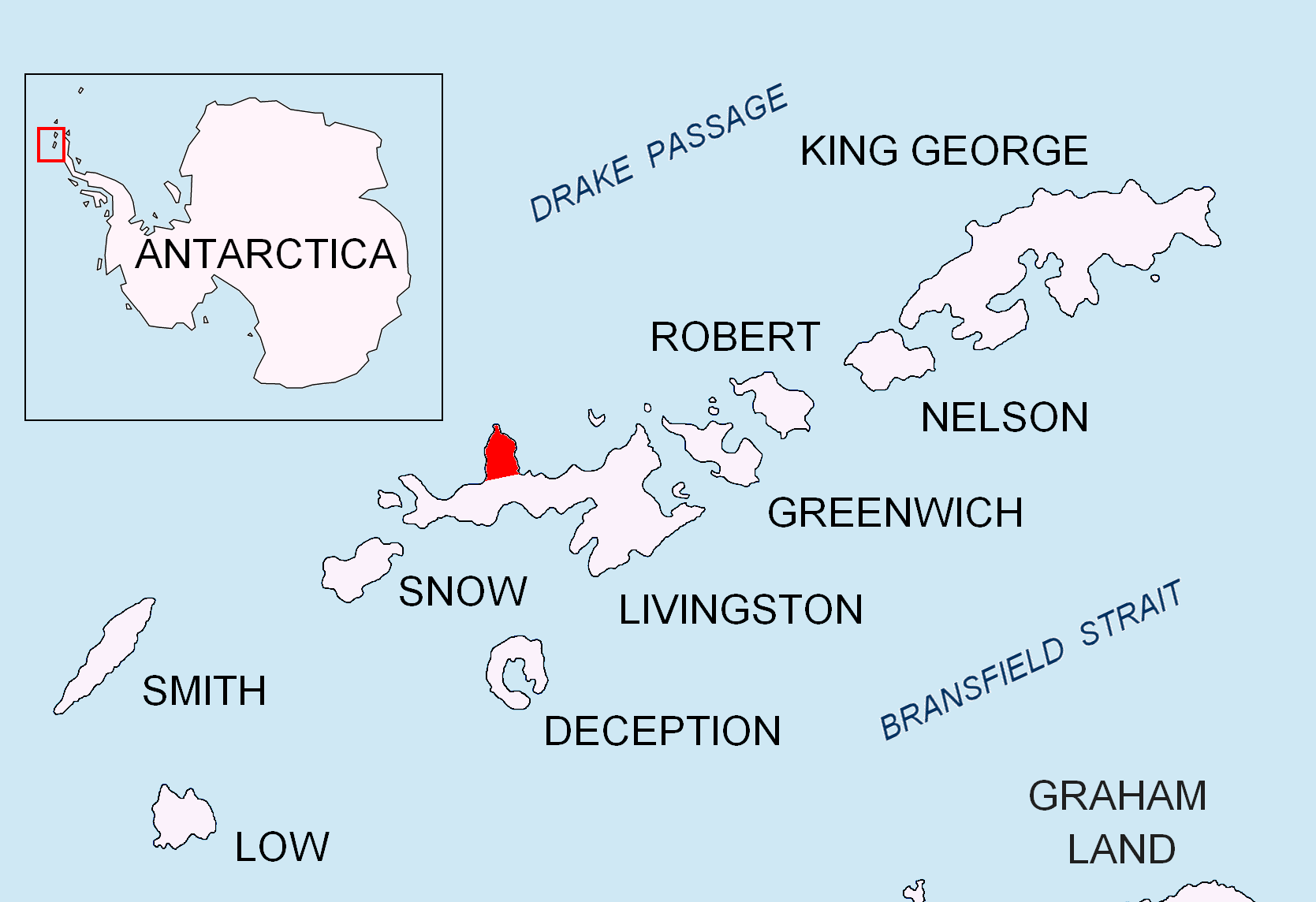
Location of Ioannes Paulus II Peninsula on Livingston Island in the South Shetland Islands

Topographic map of Livingston Island and Smith Island

Toqui Hill is the 82 m summit of the small (2.6 km by 1.6 km) ice-free promontory forming the north extremity of Ioannes Paulus II Peninsula, western Livingston Island in the South Shetland Islands, Antarctica and ending up in Cape Shirreff. It surmounts Mansa Cove to the northeast, Yamana Beach to the west and Shirreff Cove to the west and southwest.

The feature is named after ‘Toqui’, the title of the wartime chiefs of the Mapuche people.

== Location ==
The hill is located at 62°28′04″S 60°47′29.3″W which is 1 km south of Cape Shirreff and 850 m east-southeast of Rapa Nui Point (Detailed Chilean mapping in 2004, and Bulgarian mapping in 2005 and 2009).

== Maps ==
- Cape Shirreff, ASPA No. 149: Breeding wildlife sites and human features. Punta Arenas: Instituto Antártico Chileno (INACH), 2004
- L.L. Ivanov et al. Antarctica: Livingston Island and Greenwich Island, South Shetland Islands. Scale 1:100000 topographic map. Sofia: Antarctic Place-names Commission of Bulgaria, 2005
- L. Ivanov. Antarctica: Livingston Island and Smith Island. Scale 1:100000 topographic map. Manfred Wörner Foundation, 2017. ISBN 978-619-90008-3-0
