= Rapa Nui Point =

Geological formation in Antarctica

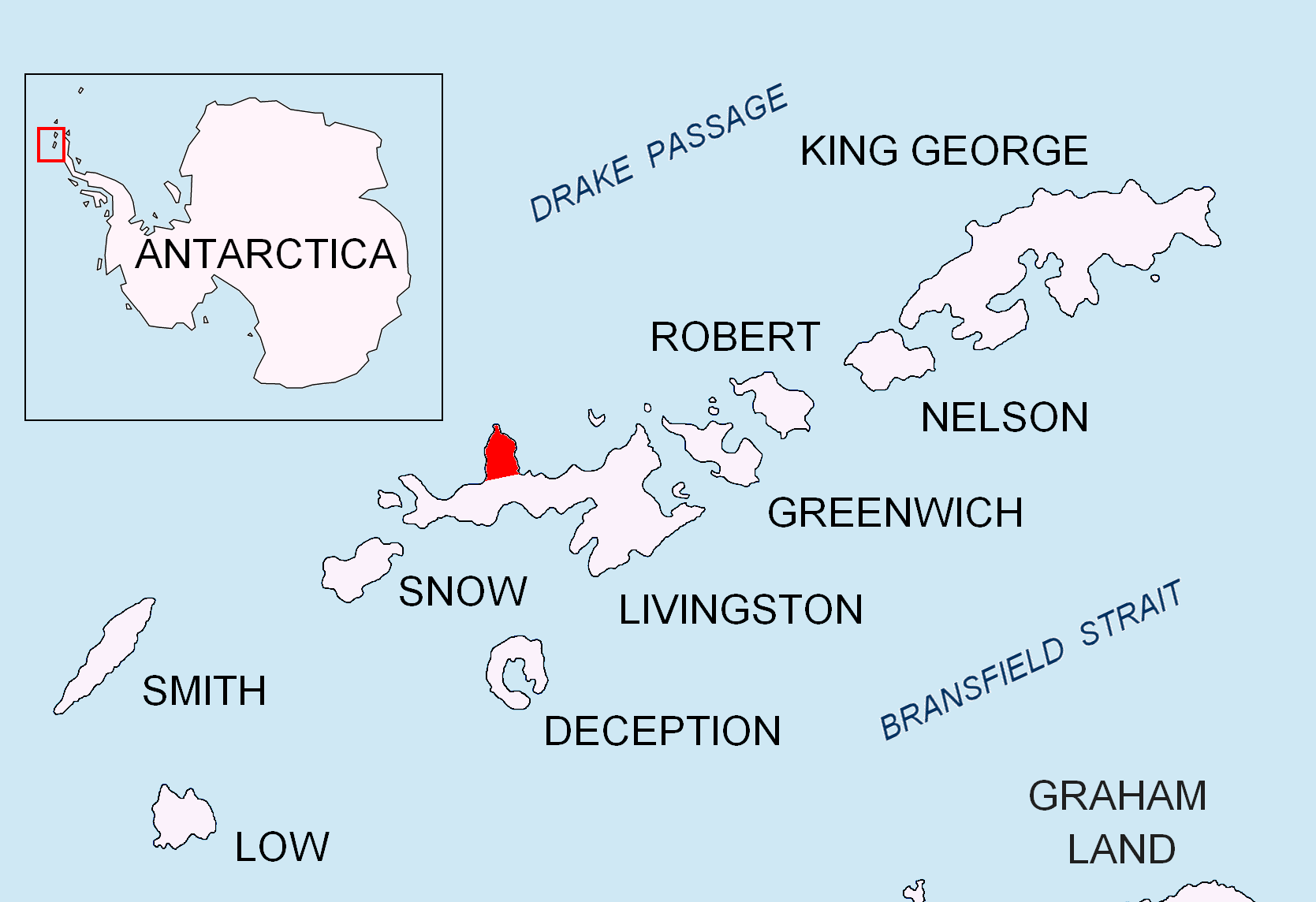
Location of Ioannes Paulus II Peninsula on Livingston Island in the South Shetland Islands.

Rapa Nui Point is a rocky point projecting 180 m westwards into Shirreff Cove from the west coast of the small (2.6 km by 1.6 km) ice-free promontory forming the north extremity of Ioannes Paulus II Peninsula, western Livingston Island in the South Shetland Islands, Antarctica and ending up in Cape Shirreff. The point is dominated by Scarborough Castle, a 35 m crag roughly charted and descriptively named by the British sealer Captain Robert Fildes in 1821.

The feature is named descriptively from its resemblance to the moai figures of Easter Island (Rapa Nui), Chile.

== Location ==
Rapa Nui Point is located at 62°27′57″S 60°48′27″W which is 1.24 km southwest of Cape Shirreff, 2.81 km north-northeast of Mercury Bluff and 1.15 km northeast of San Telmo Island (British mapping in 1821, 1948 and 1968, Chilean in 1962, 1971 and detailed one in 2004, Bulgarian in 2005 and 2009).

== Maps ==
- Map 3. Cape Shirreff, ASPA No. 149: Breeding wildlife sites and human features. Punta Arenas: Instituto Antártico Chileno (INACH), 2004.
- L.L. Ivanov et al. Antarctica: Livingston Island and Greenwich Island, South Shetland Islands. Scale 1:100000 topographic map. Sofia: Antarctic Place-names Commission of Bulgaria, 2005.
- L.L. Ivanov. Antarctica: Livingston Island and Greenwich, Robert, Snow and Smith Islands. Scale 1:120000 topographic map. Troyan: Manfred Wörner Foundation, 2009. ISBN 978-954-92032-6-4
