= Belomortsi Point =

Location of Livingston Island in the South Shetland Islands

Topographic map of Livingston Island

Belomortsi Point (Bulgarian: нос Беломорци, ‘Nos Belomortsi’ \'nos be-lo-'mor-tsi\) is the sharp and low ice-free point projecting 140 m northwestwards from Gerlovo Beach on Ioannes Paulus II Peninsula, Livingston Island in Antarctica. The feature is named after the settlement of Belomortsi in Northeastern Bulgaria.

== Location ==
Belomortsi Point is located at 62°28′59″S 60°48′30″W, which is 1.2 km northeast of Mercury Bluff, 850 m southeast of San Telmo Island and 2.3 km south of the northwest extremity of Cape Shirreff. British mapping in 1968, and Bulgarian in 2005, 2009 and 2017.

== Maps ==
- L.L. Ivanov et al. Antarctica: Livingston Island and Greenwich Island, South Shetland Islands. Scale 1:100000 topographic map. Sofia: Antarctic Place-names Commission of Bulgaria, 2005.
- L.L. Ivanov. Antarctica: Livingston Island and Greenwich, Robert, Snow and Smith Islands. Scale 1:120000 topographic map. Troyan: Manfred Wörner Foundation, 2009.
- Antarctic Digital Database (ADD). Scale 1:250000 topographic map of Antarctica. Scientific Committee on Antarctic Research (SCAR). Since 1993, regularly upgraded and updated
