= Spiller Cove =

Coordinates: 62°30′S 60°43′W

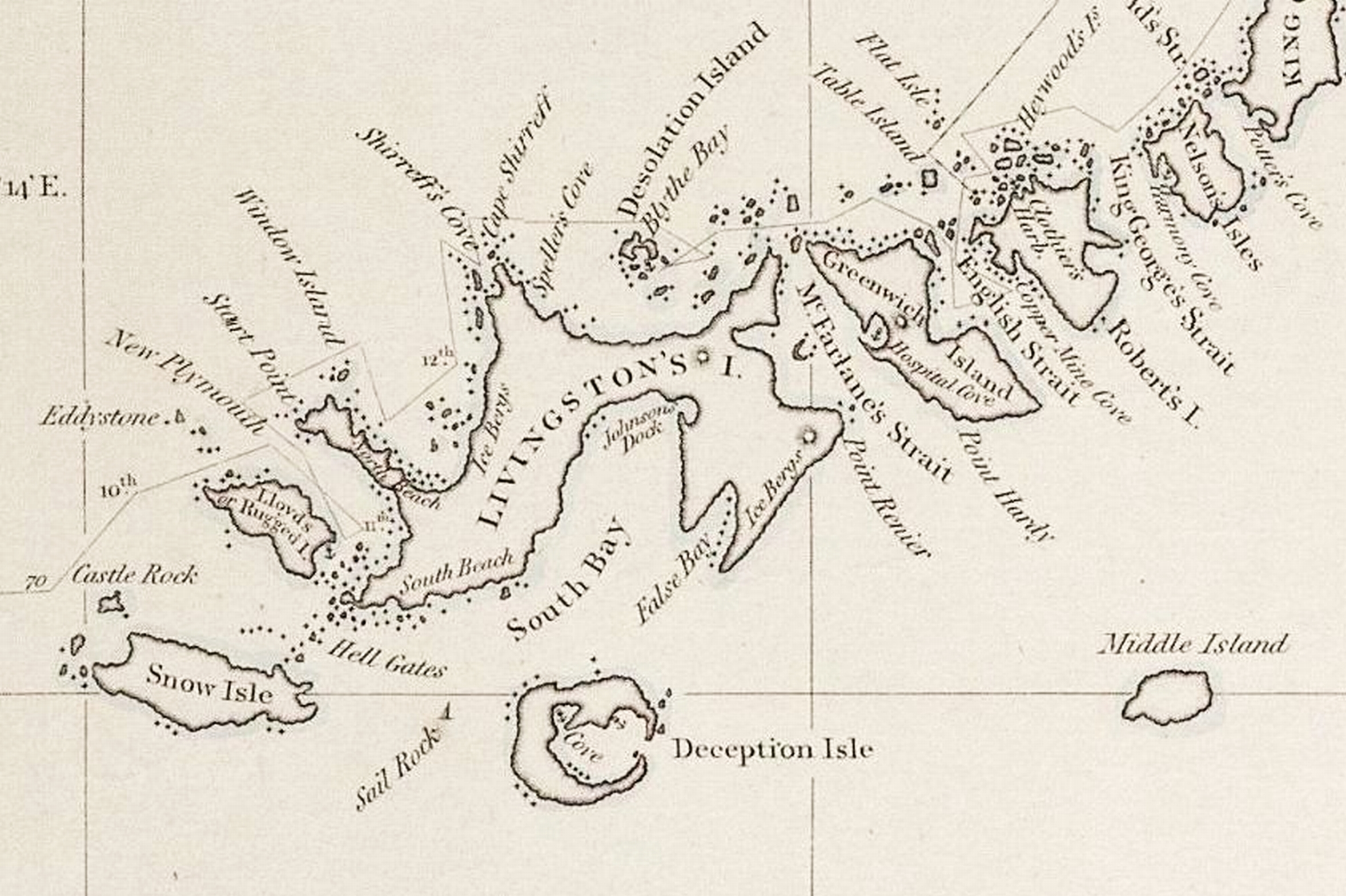
Fragment of George Powell's 1822 chart of the South Shetland Islands and South Orkney Islands featuring Spiller Cove

Topographic map of Livingston and Smith Islands

Spiller Cove is a small cove, part of Porlier Bay lying immediately west of Black Point along the north coast of Livingston Island, in the South Shetland Islands, which form a group of islands in the Antarctic Peninsula.

The name Spillers Cove was first mentioned by Robert Fildes in 1821. It is probably named for Captain Spiller of Liverpool, who visited the South Shetland Islands in 1820-21 and brought back some of Fildes' crew of the wrecked Cora from Desolation Island.
