= Fortín Rock =

Rock off South Shetland Islands

Fortín Rock (62°28′S 60°44′W) is a conspicuous rock or sea stack lying off Black Point, Livingston Island, in the South Shetland Islands. The name appears in a 1953 volume of Argentine sailing directions for Antarctica and Argentine charts. In Spanish, "fortín" means small fort. This feature has sometimes been misidentified on charts as Scarborough Castle.
