= Dreyfus Point =

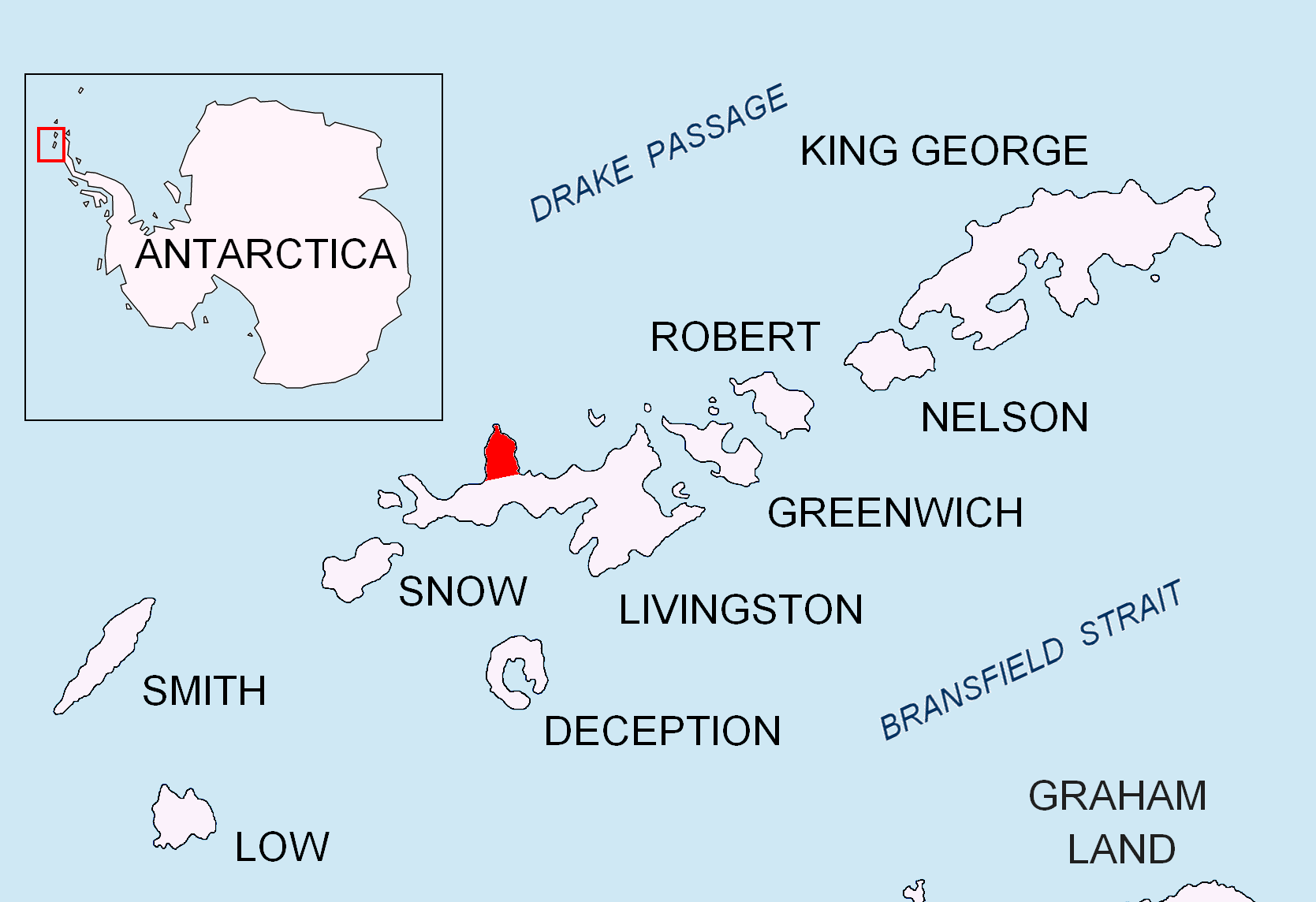
Location of Ioannes Paulus II Peninsula on Livingston Island in the South Shetland Islands.

Topographic map of Livingston Island, Greenwich, Robert, Snow and Smith Islands.

Dreyfus Point is a rounded low point on the west coast of Ioannes Paulus II Peninsula, western Livingston Island in the South Shetland Islands, Antarctica.

The feature is named after Iván Dreyfus, an Air Force engineer who participated in the 1949 Chilean Antarctic Expedition.

== Location ==
Dreyfus Point is located at 62°31′03.5″S 60°50′11.4″W which is two km north-northeast of Scesa Point, 3.15 km south-southwest of Mercury Bluff, seven km south-southwest of Cape Shirreff and 800 m southwest of Kudoglu Point (British mapping in 1968 and Bulgarian in 2005 and 2009).

== Maps ==
- L.L. Ivanov et al. Antarctica: Livingston Island and Greenwich Island, South Shetland Islands. Scale 1:100000 topographic map. Sofia: Antarctic Place-names Commission of Bulgaria, 2005.
- L.L. Ivanov. Antarctica: Livingston Island and Greenwich, Robert, Snow and Smith Islands. Scale 1:120000 topographic map. Troyan: Manfred Wörner Foundation, 2009. ISBN 978-954-92032-6-4
