= Gerlovo Beach =

Beach in Antarctica

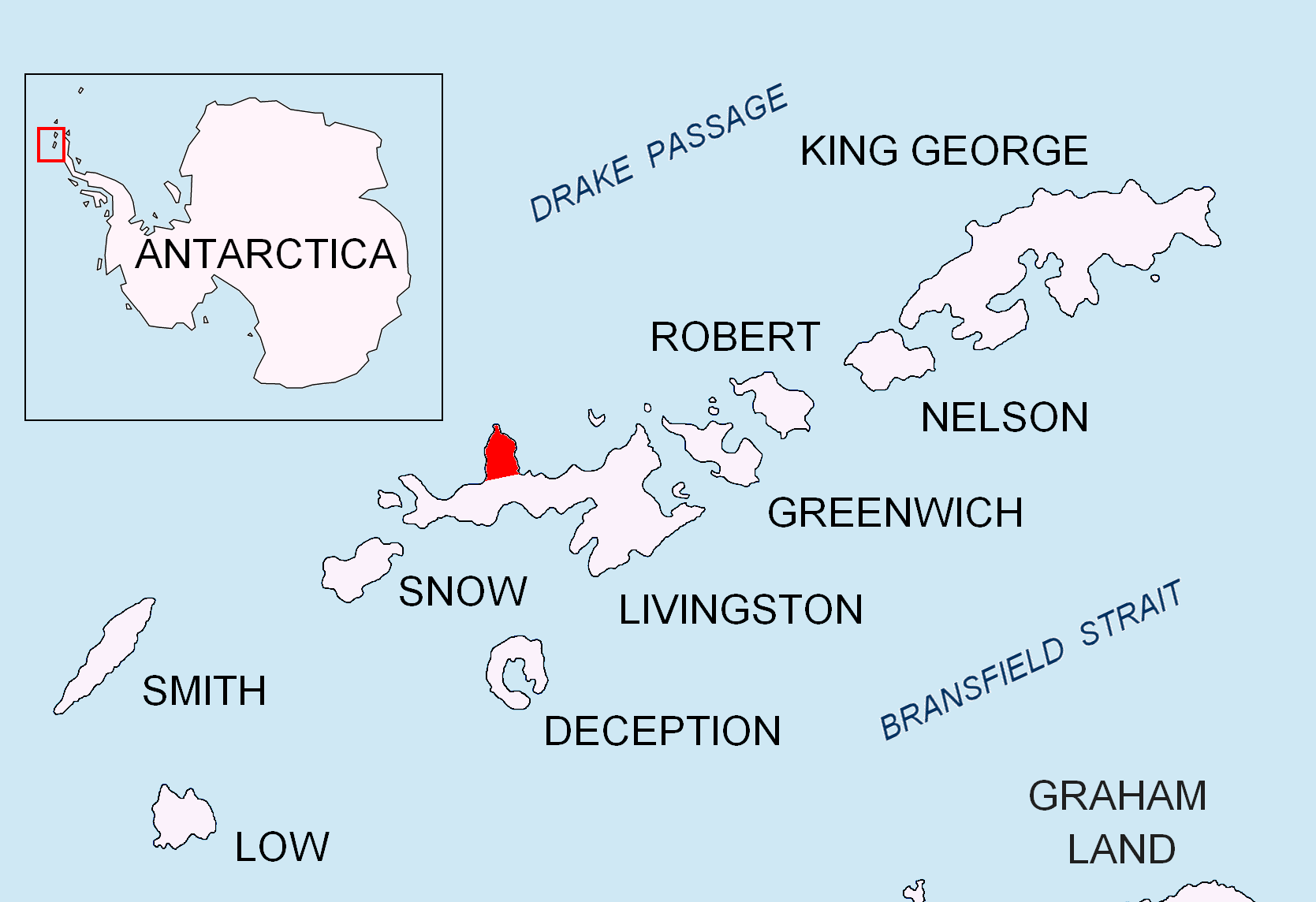
Location of Ioannes Paulus II Peninsula on Livingston Island in the South Shetland Islands

Topographic map of Livingston Island and Smith Island

Gerlovo Beach (Bulgarian: Герловски бряг, romanized: Gerlovski bryag, IPA: [ˈɡɛrɫofski ˈbrʲak]) is a beach extending 2 kilometres (1.2 mi) on the northwest coast of Ioannes Paulus II Peninsula on Livingston Island in the South Shetland Islands, Antarctica. It stretches both south and northeast of Mercury Bluff, facing San Telmo Island to the north by west, and featuring Belomortsi Point in its northern part. Snow-free in summer, with area ca. 73 hectares (180 acres). The beach is part of Antarctic Specially Protected Area ASPA 149 Cape Shirreff and San Telmo Island. The area was visited by early 19th century sealers.

The beach is named after the Gerlovo region in northeastern Bulgaria.

== Location ==
Gerlovo Beach is centred at 62°29′20″S 60°48′55″W. British mapping in 1822 and 1968, Spanish in 1991 and Bulgarian in 2009 and 2017.

== Maps ==
- Cape Shirreff, ASPA No. 149: Breeding wildlife sites and human features. Punta Arenas: Instituto Antártico Chileno (INACH), 2004
- L.L. Ivanov et al. Antarctica: Livingston Island and Greenwich Island, South Shetland Islands. Scale 1:100000 topographic map. Sofia: Antarctic Place-names Commission of Bulgaria, 2005
- L. Ivanov. Antarctica: Livingston Island and Smith Island. Scale 1:100000 topographic map. Manfred Wörner Foundation, 2017. ISBN 978-619-90008-3-0
