= Cross Hill, Deception Island =

Hill in the South Shetland Islands

Cross Hill
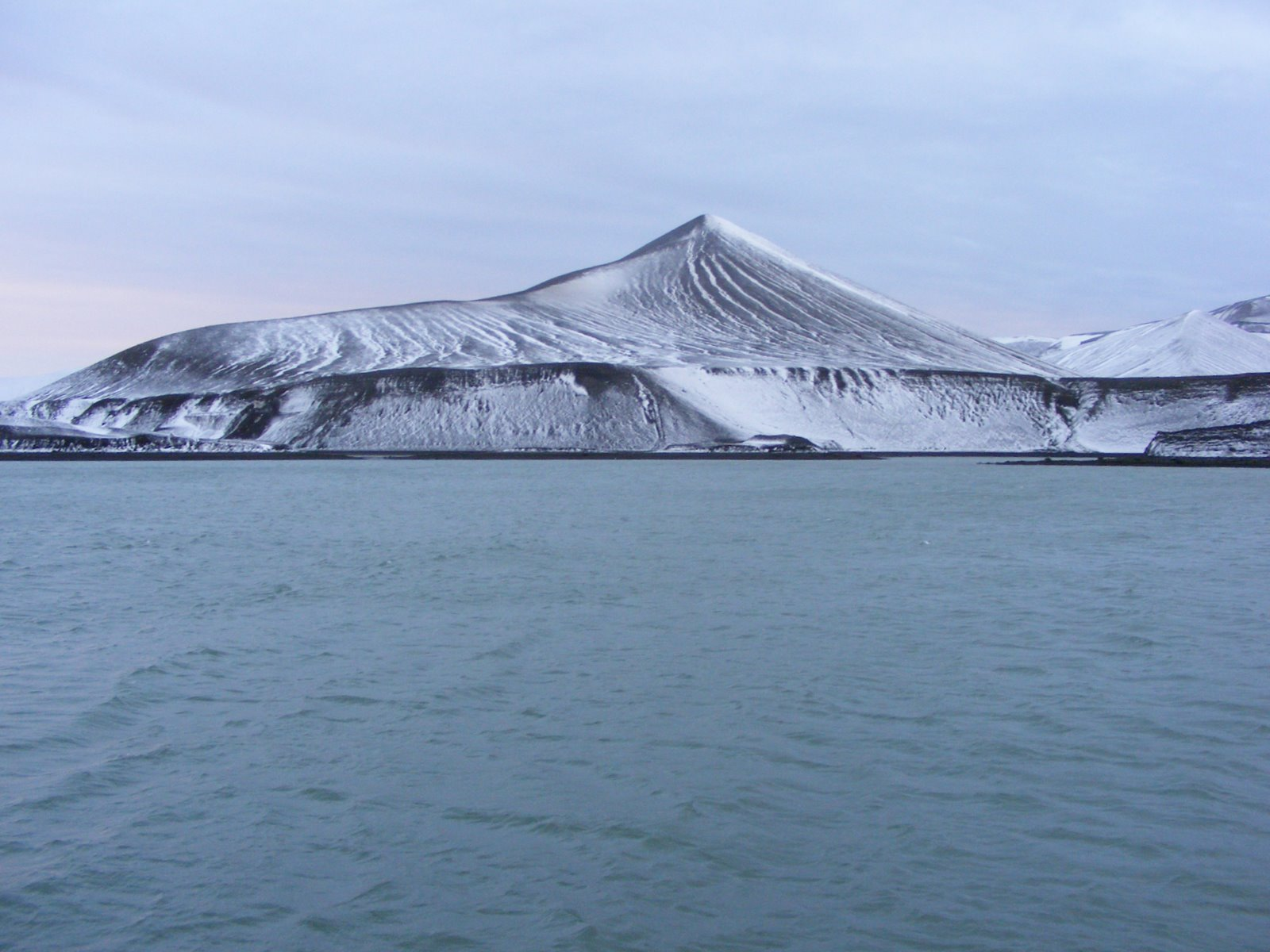
- Cross Hill viewed from Stancomb Cove in Telefon Bay.

Highest point
- Elevation: 160 m (520 ft)
- Coordinates: 62.935°S 60.6933°W

Geography

Cross Hill is a hill of 525 feet on Deception Island in the South Shetland Islands.

The hill stands on the west side of the island, to the southwest of Telefon Bay.

After the island was surveyed by the Falkland Islands Dependencies Survey in January 1954, this peak was named 'Cross Hill' from the large wooden cross, probably erected by whalers, near the summit.

A name attributed by a 1952 Argentine chart is Monte de la Laguna, meaning 'mountain of the lake', in association with the nearby Crater Lake, and it has appeared as 'Laguna Hill' in some American resources.

== See also ==
- Stancomb Cove
