= Porlier Bay =

Bay on Livingston island, Antarctica

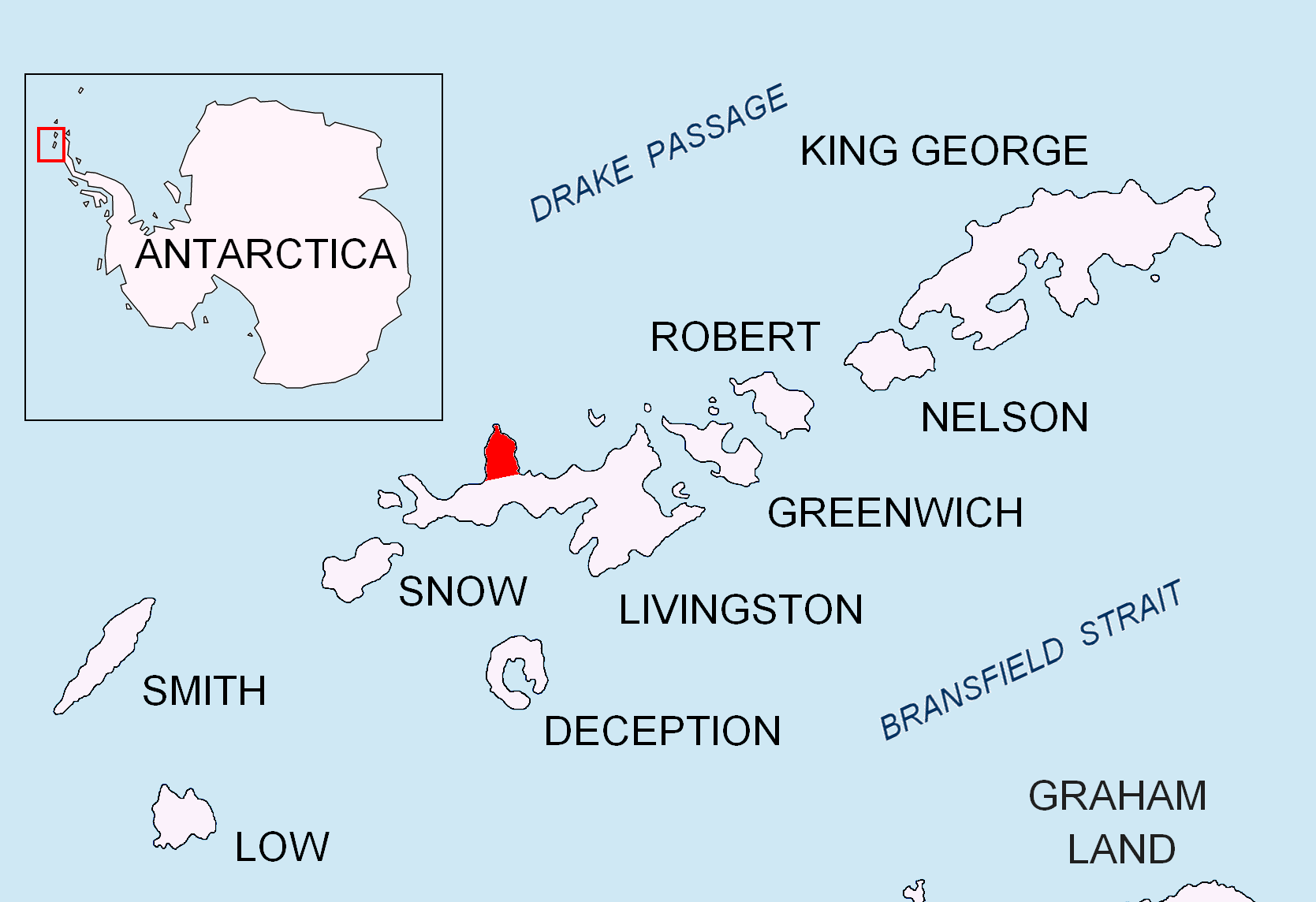
Location of Ioannes Paulus II Peninsula on Livingston Island in the South Shetland Islands

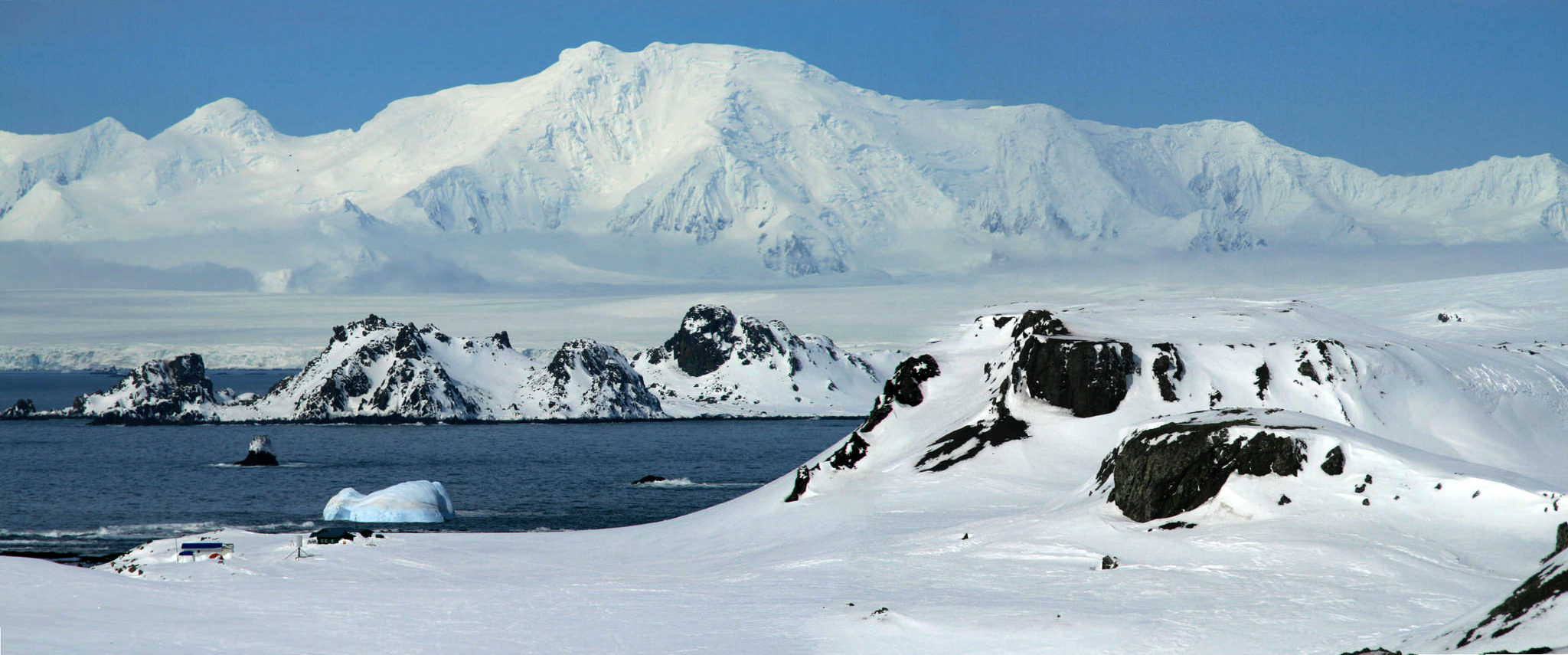
Porlier Bay and Black Point from Cape Shirreff, with Tangra Mountains in the background

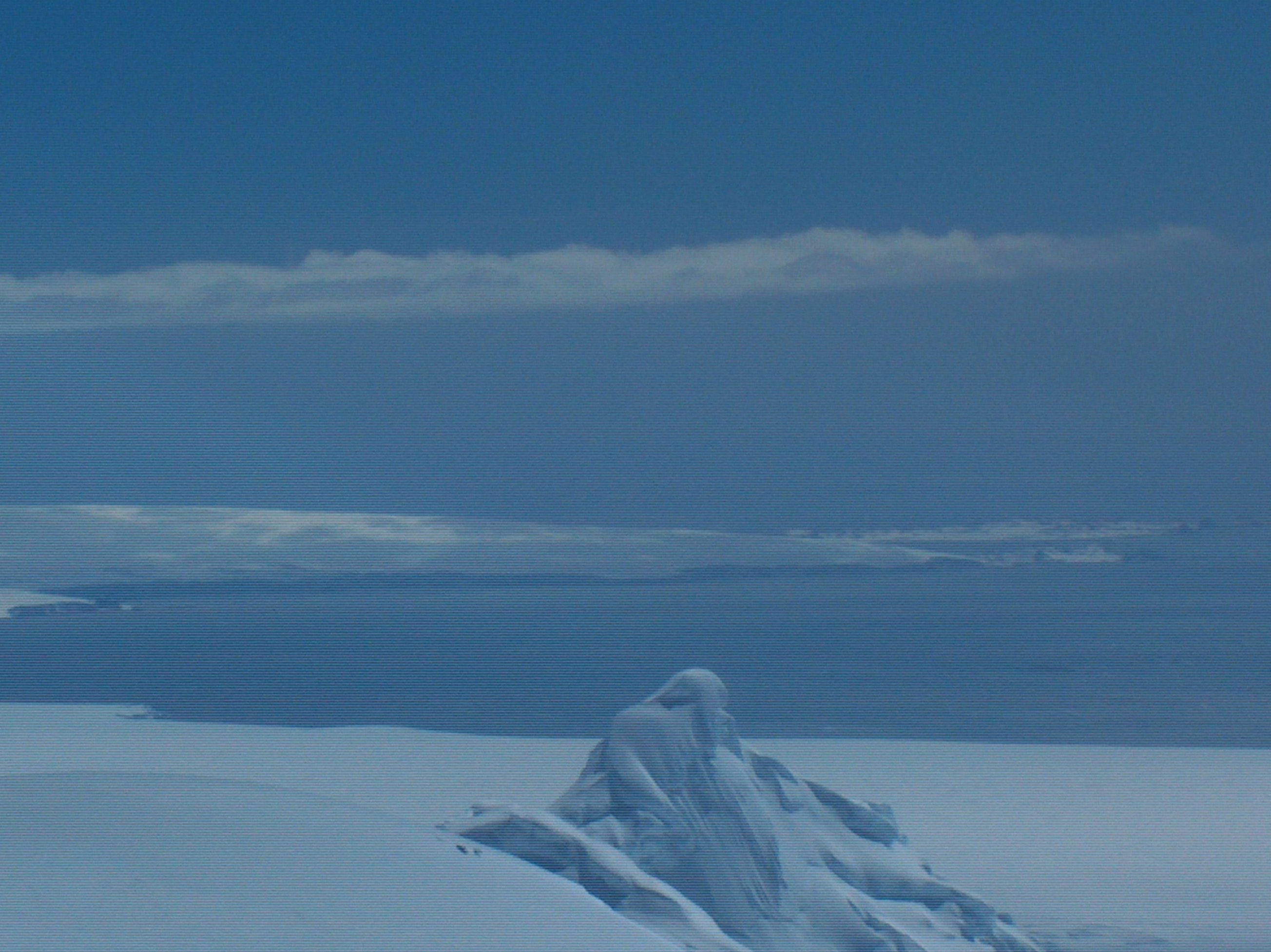
Porlier Bay in the background (on the right) from Catalunyan Saddle, with Burdick Ridge in the foreground

Topographic map of Livingston Island

Porlier Bay (Bulgarian: залив Порлиер, romanized: zaliv Porlier, IPA: [ˈzalif porliˈɛr]) is the 3 km wide bay indenting for 1.6 km the north coast of Ioannes Paulus II Peninsula on Livingston Island in the South Shetland Islands, Antarctica. It is entered between Punta del Medio and Black Point, and includes Spiller Cove on the southeast. The area was visited by early 19th-century sealers.

The feature is named after Brigadier Rosendo Porlier y Asteguieta (1771–1819), commander of the Spanish naval squadron whose flagship San Telmo sank off the island with 644 men on board including Porlier in September 1819. Remnants of the ship were found subsequently at the bay.

== Location ==
Porlier Bay is located at 62°29′10″S 60°45′00″W. British mapping in 1968, Spanish in 1991, and Bulgarian in 2005 and 2009.

== Map ==
- L.L. Ivanov. Antarctica: Livingston Island and Greenwich, Robert, Snow and Smith Islands. Scale 1:120000 topographic map. Troyan: Manfred Wörner Foundation, 2009. ISBN 978-954-92032-6-4
