= Kudoglu Point =

Southern Shetland-Islands

Location of Livingston Island in the South Shetland Islands

Topographic map featuring Kudoglu Point

Kudoglu Point (Bulgarian: нос Кудоглу, ‘Nos Kudoglu’ \'nos 'ku-do-glu\) is the sharp and low ice-free point projecting 150 m from the west side of Ioannes Paulus II Peninsula northwestwards into Barclay Bay, Livingston Island in Antarctica. It is named after the Bulgarian merchant and dedicated philanthropist Dimitar Kudoglu (1862-1940).

== Location ==
Kudoglu Point is located at 62°30′38″S 60°49′40″W, which is 800 m northeast of Dreyfus Point and 2.28 km south of Mercury Bluff. British mapping in 1968, and Bulgarian in 2005, 2009 and 2017.

== Maps ==
- L.L. Ivanov et al. Antarctica: Livingston Island and Greenwich Island, South Shetland Islands. Scale 1:100000 topographic map. Sofia: Antarctic Place-names Commission of Bulgaria, 2005.
- L.L. Ivanov. Antarctica: Livingston Island and Greenwich, Robert, Snow and Smith Islands. Scale 1:120000 topographic map. Troyan: Manfred Wörner Foundation, 2009.
- Antarctic Digital Database (ADD). Scale 1:250000 topographic map of Antarctica. Scientific Committee on Antarctic Research (SCAR). Since 1993, regularly upgraded and updated
