= Furse Peninsula =

Part of Gibbs Island, South Shetland Islands

Furse Peninsula (61°29′S 55°28′W) is the eastern part of Gibbs Island, east of The Spit, in the South Shetland Islands. The name "Narrow Island" was used by Captain George Powell in 1822, with reference to the entire island; in subsequent use the reference was occasionally limited to this peninsula. It was named in 1980 by the UK Antarctic Place-Names Committee after Commander John R. (Chris) Furse, Royal Navy, leader of the Joint Services Expedition to the Elephant Island Group, 1976–77.
