= The Spit (South Shetland Islands) =

Shingle and boulder isthmus

The Spit (61°29′S 55°30′W) is a shingle and boulder isthmus or spit, some 50 to 80 m long and 1 m above the level of high tide, connecting Furse Peninsula to the main part of Gibbs Island, South Shetland Islands in Antarctica. It was charted by Discovery Investigations in January 1937 and named descriptively.
