= Battle of Tecualoya =

- Part of the Mexican War of Independence
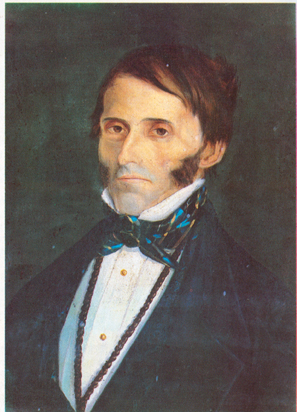
- A portrait of General Hermenegildo Galeana who commanded the Mexican insurgents in the battle.
Date	17–20 January 1812
Location	Tecualoya, State of Mexico, Mexico
Result	Spanish Royalist victory

Belligerents
Mexican Rebels	Spanish Empire

Commanders and leaders
Hermenegildo Galeana	Rosendo Porlier y Asteguieta

The Battle of Tecualoya was a military action of the Mexican War of Independence fought between 17–20 January 1812 in the canyons of Tecualoya, Mexico. The battle was fought between the royalist forces loyal to the Spanish crown and the Mexican rebels fighting for independence from the Spanish Empire. The Mexican insurgents were commanded by General Hermenegildo Galeana and the Spanish by Rosendo Porlier y Asteguieta. The battle resulted in a humiliating defeat for Galeana and his army. The Mexican insurgents lost all their artillery, though they would later recover these field pieces at the Battle of Tenancingo where General José María Oviedo would be killed in action.

== See also ==
- Mexican War of Independence
