= Battle of Tenancingo =

- Part of the Mexican War of Independence
- A map of the campaigns of José María Morelos y Pavón. Tenancingo battlefield, in the State of Mexico, is above center.
Date	22 January 1812
Location	Tenancingo de Degollado, State of Mexico, Mexico
Result	Mexican rebel victory

Belligerents
Mexican Rebels	Spanish Empire

Commanders and leaders
José María Morelos y Pavón	Rosendo Porlier y Asteguieta

The Battle of Tenancingo was a military action of the Mexican War of Independence fought on 22 January 1812 on the outskirts of Tenancingo de Degollado, State of Mexico. The battle was fought between the royalist forces loyal to the Spanish crown and the Mexican rebels fighting for independence from the Spanish Empire. The Mexican insurgents were commanded by General José María Morelos y Pavón and the Spanish by Rosendo Porlier y Asteguieta. The battle resulted in a victory for the Mexican rebels.

== The battle ==
Rosendo Porlier y Asteguieta initially met with success in this campaign, defeating the forces of Hermenegildo Galeana at the Battle of Tecualoya. His victorious army then marched to Tenancingo de Degollado. Porlier was initially in a position to enter the town and recapture it for the Spanish crown, but he failed to do so. General José María Morelos y Pavón and his forces arrived at the city from the south after receiving pleas for help from Tenango del Valle and from Heroica Zitácuaro and proceeded to give battle. After a bitter fight, Morelos' army proved to be victorious. Initially, Morelos was going to continue his march towards Mexico City, but news had reached him of the insurgent defeat at the Battle of Zitácuaro and the flight of the "Suprema Junta Nacional Gubernativa" from that city. He went on to cancel his advance on Mexico as the rebel forces reorganized themselves following that crushing defeat.

== See also ==
- Mexican War of Independence
