= Plenty =

Plenty may refer to:

== Places ==
- Plenty, Victoria, a town in Australia
- Plenty River (Victoria), a river in the Australian state of Victoria
- Plenty River (Northern Territory), a river in the Northern Territory of Australia
- Plenty, Tasmania, a small locality and river in Australia
- Plenty, Saskatchewan, a village in Canada
- Bay of Plenty, in New Zealand
  - Bay of Plenty Region, New Zealand
- Cape Plenty, in the South Shetland Islands of Antarctica

== Arts and entertainment ==
- Plenty (play), by David Hare
- Plenty (film), a 1985 film directed by Fred Schepisi, adapted from Hare's play
- Plenty (band), a Japanese rock band
- Plenty (album), a 2010 album by the English band Red Box
- "Plenty", a song by Northlane from Obsidian
- “Plenty”, a song by Sarah McLachlan from Fumbling Towards Ecstasy
- Plenty O'Toole, a character in the 1971 James Bond film Diamonds Are Forever

== Other uses ==
- Plenty International, an outreach program
- Plenty: One Man, One Woman, and a Raucous Year of Eating Locally, the alternate name of the non-fiction book The 100-Mile Diet
- The translated name of Sūrat al-Kawthar in the Quran
- Plenty (brand), a brand of paper towel sold in the UK
- Plenty Highway, in Australia
