= Gibbs Island (South Shetland Islands) =

Island of Antarctica

- A map of the South Shetland Islands

- Location within Antarctic Peninsula Location within Antarctica

Geography
- Location: Antarctica
- Coordinates: 61°28′S 055°34′W
- Archipelago: South Shetland Islands
- Area: 22 km^{2} (8.5 sq mi)
- Length: 13 km (8.1 mi)
- Width: 2 km (1.2 mi)

Administration
- Administered under the Antarctic Treaty System

Demographics
- Population: Uninhabited
- Ethnic groups: None

Gibbs Island (Russian: остров Рожнова) lies 25 km (16 mi) southwest of Elephant Island in the South Shetland Islands of Antarctica. James Weddell, whose chart of the islands appeared in 1825, was apparently the first to use the current name of this island, discovered in 1821 by Russians who then named it Rozhnov Island (as it is known in Russia today).

== Description ==
Gibbs is a slender, east–west aligned island, some 13 km (8.1 mi) long, 2 km (1.2 mi) wide and 22 km^{2} (8 sq mi) in area. It is bordered to the south by Bransfield Strait and to the north by the Loper Channel. The isthmus of The Spit joins the main part of Gibbs Island in the west to Furse Peninsula in the east.

=== Important Bird Area ===
A 369 ha tract of land comprising Furse Peninsula, The Spit and a small ice-free area on Gibbs Island west of The Spit has been identified as an Important Bird Area (IBA) by BirdLife International because it supports breeding colonies of about 1700 pairs of macaroni and 190 pairs of chinstrap penguins, as well as over 18,000 pairs of southern fulmars.

== See also ==
- Cape Plenty
- List of Antarctic and subantarctic islands
