= The Watchkeeper =

The Watchkeeper (62°18′S 59°49′W) is a low rock fringed on the north side by sunken rocks, lying 2.5 nautical miles (4.6 kilometres; 2.9 miles) north of Table Island in the South Shetland Islands. This feature was known to early sealers in the area as Flat Isle, but in recent years The Watchkeeper has overtaken the early name in usage. It was charted by DI personnel on the Discovery II in 1935.
