= Scarborough Castle (South Shetland Islands) =

Coordinates: 62°28′S 60°48′W

Scarborough Castle is a crag rising to about 30 m near the northeast entrance point to Shirreff Cove, Livingston Island, in the South Shetland Islands. Roughly charted and named by British sealer Robert Fildes in 1821.
