= Stancomb Cove =

Cove along Deception Island, Antarctica

Stancomb Cove (62°56′S 60°41′W) is a cove northeast of Cross Hill in the northwest part of Port Foster, Deception Island, in the South Shetland Islands. The feature was formed as the result of volcanic eruptions on the island between December 1967 and August 1970. Surveyed from HMS Endurance in January 1988 and named after the survey boat Stancomb-Wills used in the survey.
