= Black Point (Livingston Island) =

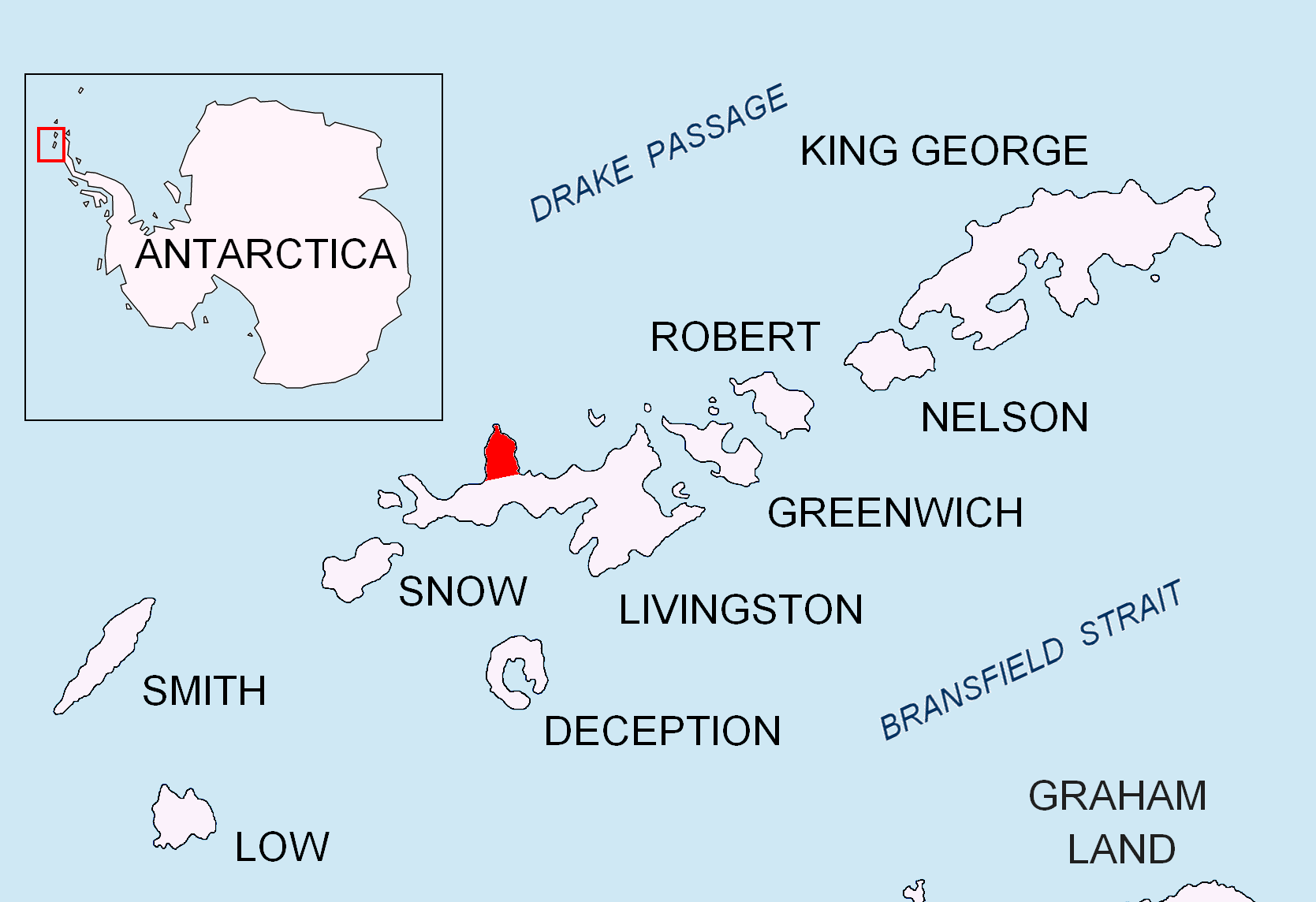
Location of Ioannes Paulus II Peninsula on Livingston Island in the South Shetland Islands

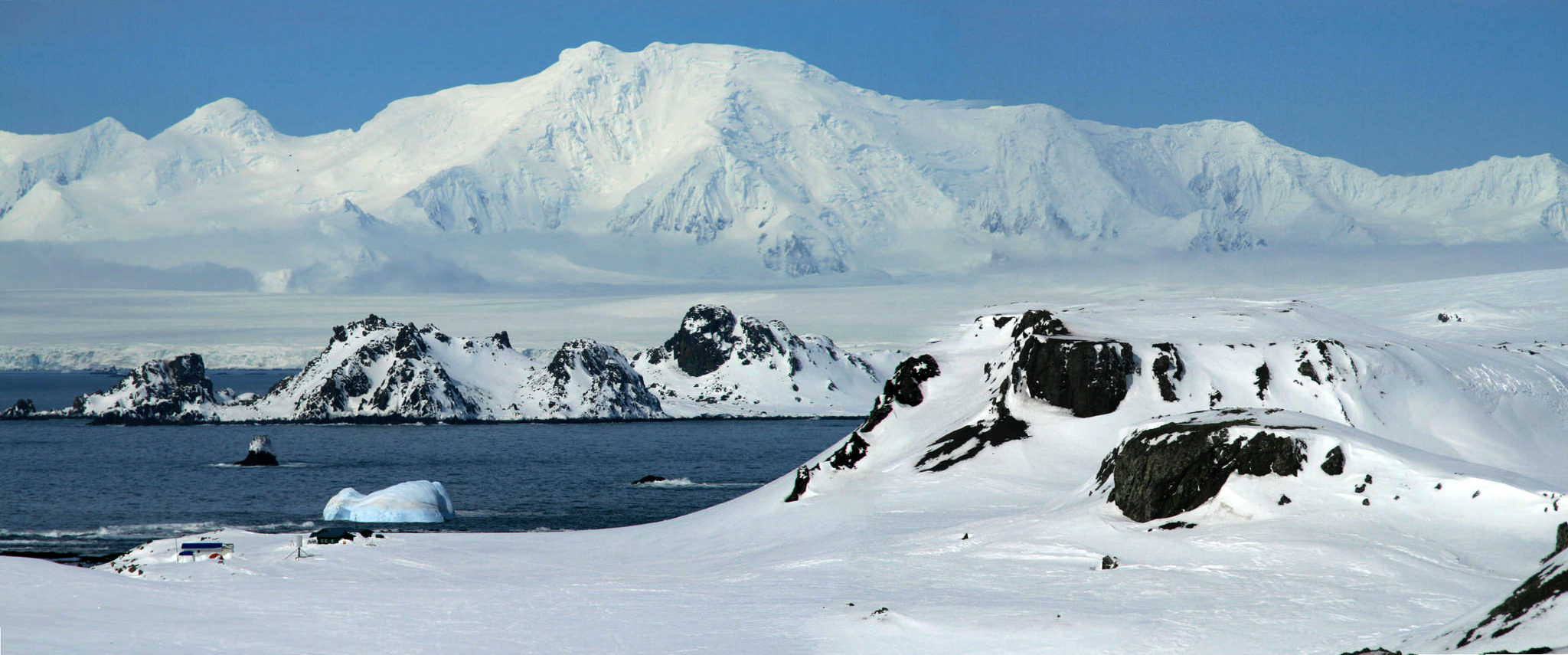
Black Point and Porlier Bay from Cape Shirreff, with Tangra Mountains in the background

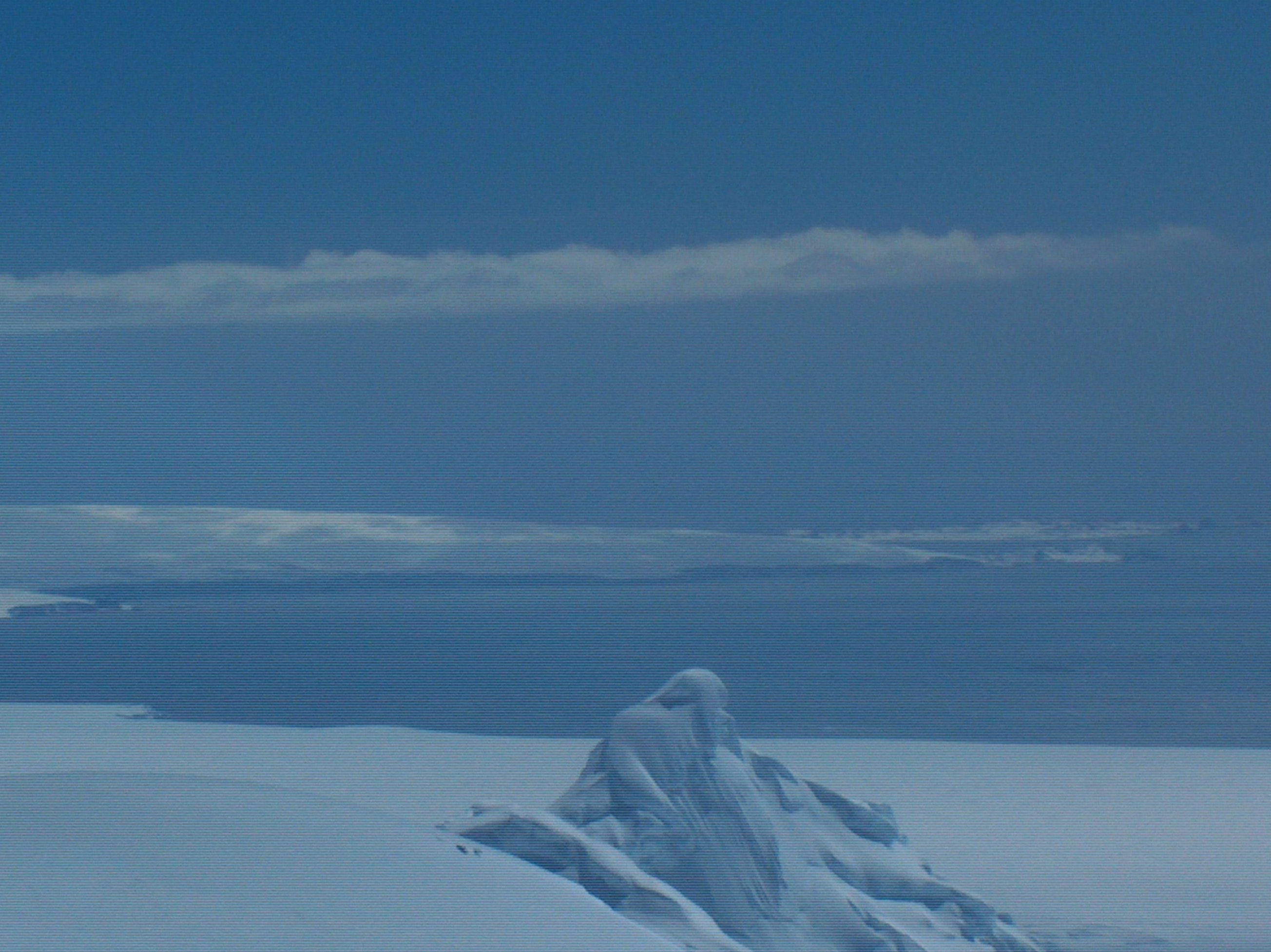
Black Point in the background (on the right, with Cape Shirreff behind it) from Catalunyan Saddle; Burdick Ridge in the foreground

Topographic map of Livingston Island

Black Point is a rocky promontory of 38 hectares (94 acres) projecting 800 m northwards from the northeast coast of Ioannes Paulus II Peninsula into Hero Bay, Livingston Island in the South Shetland Islands, Antarctica to form the east side of the entrance to Porlier Bay. The area was visited by early 19th century sealers.

The name of the point is a descriptive one. Fortín Rock is a sea stack lying off Black Point.

== Location ==
The point is located at 62°29′09.7″S 60°42′57.6″W which is 4.8 km southeast of Cape Shirreff, 18.3 km west-southwest of Desolation Island, 15.88 km west-northwest of Siddins Point, 10 km north-northwest of Avitohol Point, 6.3 km north by west of Agüero Point and 3 km north by west of Sandanski Point. British mapping in 1968, Chilean in 1971, Argentine in 1980, Spanish in 1991, and Bulgarian in 2005 and 2009.

== Map ==
- L.L. Ivanov et al. Antarctica: Livingston Island and Greenwich Island, South Shetland Islands. Scale 1:100000 topographic map. Sofia: Antarctic Place-names Commission of Bulgaria, 2005.
