= Mercury Bluff =

Mercury Coast

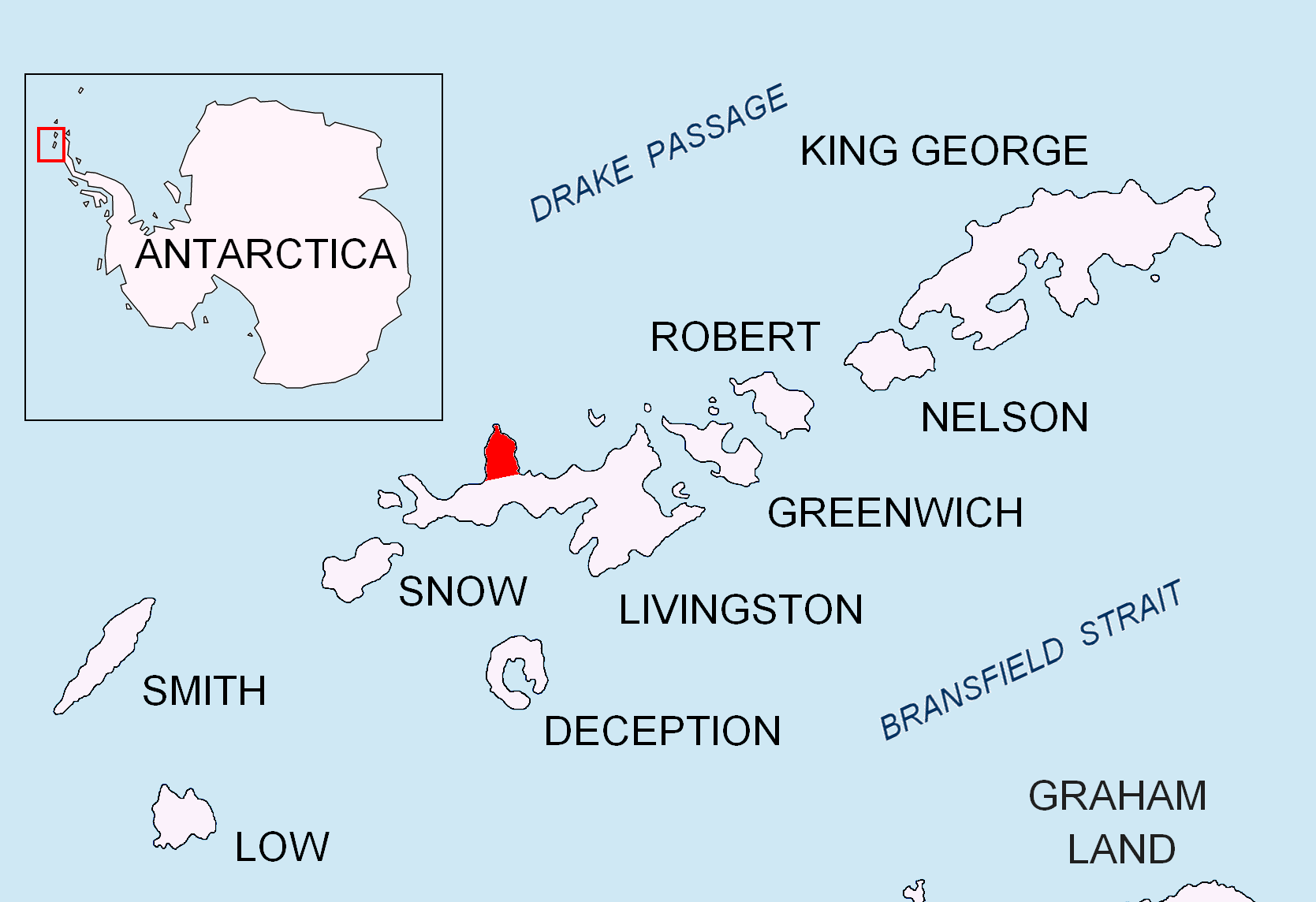
Location of Ioannes Paulus II Peninsula on Livingston Island in the South Shetland Islands.

Topographic map of Livingston Island, Greenwich, Robert, Snow and Smith Islands.

Mercury Bluff is a perpendicular bluff on Gerlovo Beach in the northwest of Ioannes Paulus II Peninsula, Livingston Island in the South Shetland Islands, Antarctica. The area was visited by early 19th century sealers.

The feature is named after the British sealing ship Mercury under Captain Robert Wetherell that operated out of the nearby Shirreff Cove in 1820–21.

== Location ==
The point is located at 62°29′23.6″S 60°49′27.6″W which is 3.9 km south-southwest of Cape Shirreff, 2.28 km north of Kudoglu Point and 12 km north-northeast of Rowe Point and 20.85 km east-northeast of Essex Point (British mapping in 1821 and 1968, Chilean in 1971, Argentine in 1980, Spanish in 1991, and Bulgarian in 2005 and 2009).

== Maps ==
- L.L. Ivanov et al. Antarctica: Livingston Island and Greenwich Island, South Shetland Islands. Scale 1:100000 topographic map. Sofia: Antarctic Place-names Commission of Bulgaria, 2005.
- L.L. Ivanov. Antarctica: Livingston Island and Greenwich, Robert, Snow and Smith Islands. Scale 1:120000 topographic map. Troyan: Manfred Wörner Foundation, 2009. ISBN 978-954-92032-6-4
