= Spanish ship San Telmo =

Ship of the line of the Spanish Navy

Coordinates: 62°20′S 60°30′W

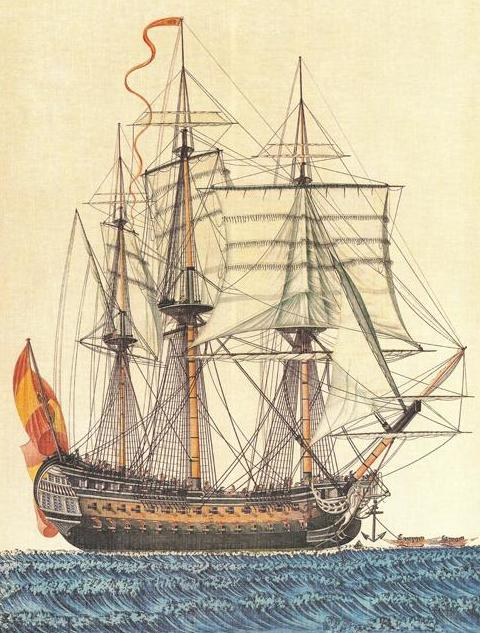
- Illustration of San Telmo by Alejo Berlinguero at the Naval Museum of Madrid

History

Spain
- Name: San Telmo
- Namesake: Peter González or Erasmus of Formia
- Operator: Spanish Navy
- Launched: 20 June 1788
- Fate: Sunk, 2 September 1819

General characteristics
- Displacement: 2,550 tons
- Length: 53 m (174 ft)
- Beam: 14.5 m (48 ft)
- Complement: 644

San Telmo was a 74-gun ship of the line of the Spanish Navy launched in 1788. It sank in 1819, while bringing reinforcements to Peru during the war of independence. Based on the location where it was lost, it has been speculated that survivors may have reached Antarctica.

== History ==
In 1819, the San Telmo, commanded by Captain Joaquín de Toledo y Parra, was the flagship of a Spanish naval squadron under Brigadier Rosendo Porlier y Asteguieta bound for Callao, Peru, to reinforce colonial forces there fighting the independence movements in Spanish America. It was damaged by severe weather in the Drake Passage, south of Cape Horn on 2 September 1819, and sank with all 644 people on board.

== Legacy ==
Some remnants and signs of the wreckage were later found by William Smith on Livingston Island in the South Shetland Islands, located on the Antarctic continental shelf. If any crew members survived the initial sinking and managed to land there, they would have been the first people to reach the continent on its insular part. San Telmo Island, off the north coast of Livingston Island, is named after the ship. The first one to land and not only see the continental part of Antarctica may have been Andrew MacFarlane, a Scottish to the service of Chile in October 1820, as well as the American John Davis in February 1821.

Prior to the battle that led to the capture of Valdivia in February 1820, the patriot force told the Spanish garrison of the Valdivian Fort System they were part of the convoy of San Telmo. Using this tactic they were able to approach the beach at Aguada del Inglés largely undisturbed before their amphibious assault begun.

In 1985 a skull belonging to an indigenous woman was found on Yamana Beach, and may be related to the San Telmo.

== See also ==
- List of ships of the line of Spain
- List of disasters in Antarctica by death toll
