= Cape Plenty =

Cape Plenty (61°30′S 55°28′W) is the southeast cape of Gibbs Island (actually marks south point of the island), in the South Shetland Islands. Visited by JSEEIG in January 1977 and so named because a reef east of the cape causes upwelling of water which attracts numerous birds to feed in the area. Approved by United Kingdom Antarctic Place-Names Committee (UK-APC) in 1980.
