= Yamana Beach =

Beach in Antarctica

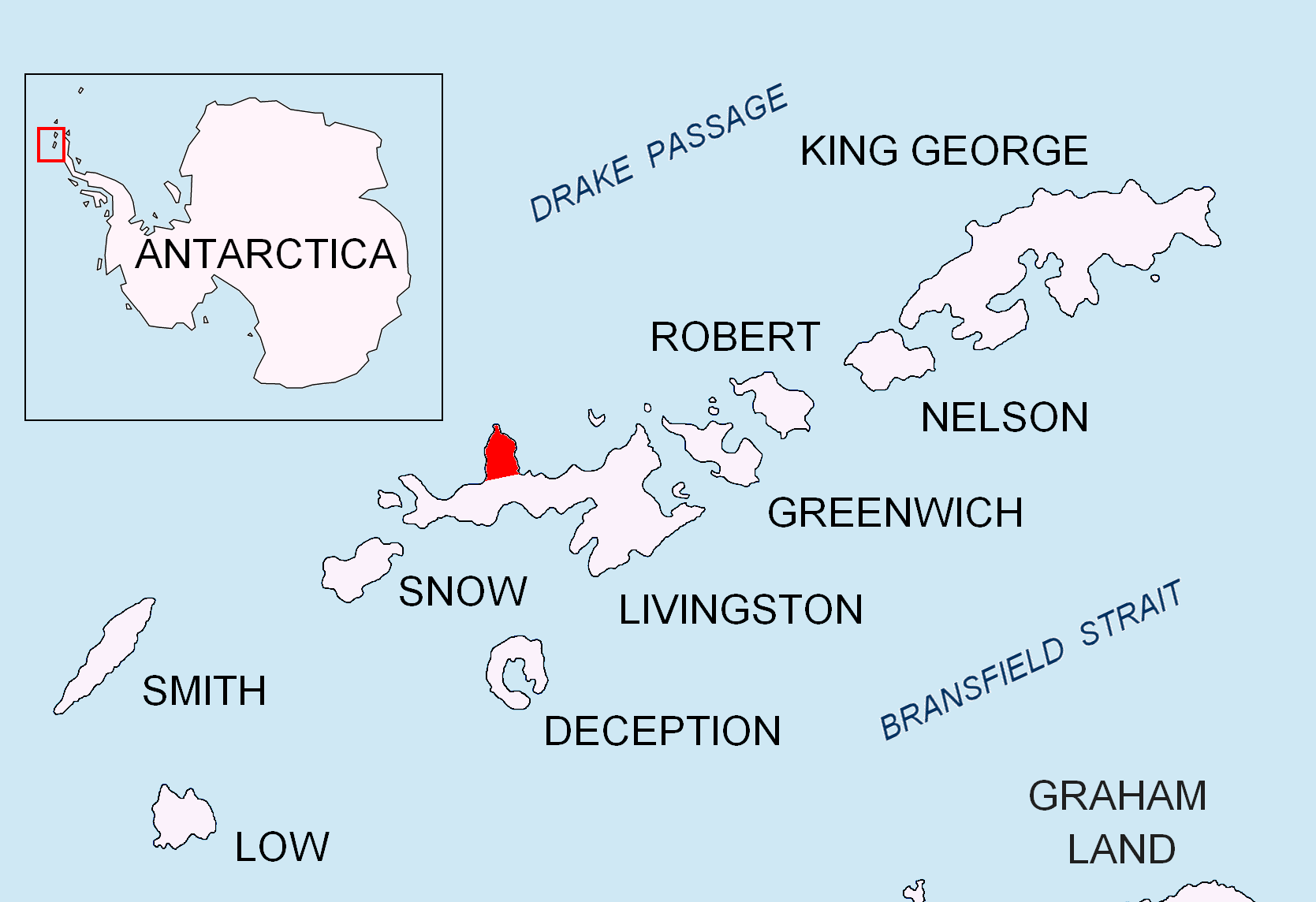
Location of Ioannes Paulus II Peninsula on Livingston Island in the South Shetland Islands

Topographic map of Livingston Island

Yamana Beach (Spanish: Playa Yamana) is an ice-free beach extending approximately 500 m (550 yd) on the west coast of Cape Shirreff at the northern extremity of Ioannes Paulus II Peninsula, Livingston Island in Antarctica. It is surmounted by Toqui Hill on the east. The beach is part of Antarctic Specially Protected Area ASPA 149 Cape Shirreff and San Telmo Island. The area was visited by early 19th century sealers.

The name was given by scientific personnel of the Chilean Antarctic Institute in 1985, in connection with Daniel Torres Navarro who discovered the skull of a young indigenous Yamana woman. According to research, she was in her early 20s, and she might had died around 1819 to 1825 on a sealing mission, making hers the oldest known human remains on Antarctic soil.

== Location ==
Yamana Beach is centred at 62°28′08″S 60°47′53″W. Chilean mapping in 2004, Bulgarian in 2017.

== Maps ==
- Map 3. Cape Shirreff, ASPA No. 149. Instituto Antártico Chileno, April 2004
- L. Ivanov. Antarctica: Livingston Island and Smith Island. Scale 1:100000 topographic map. Manfred Wörner Foundation, 2017
- Antarctic Digital Database (ADD). Scale 1:250000 topographic map of Antarctica. Scientific Committee on Antarctic Research (SCAR). Since 1993, regularly upgraded and updated
