= Shirreff Cove =

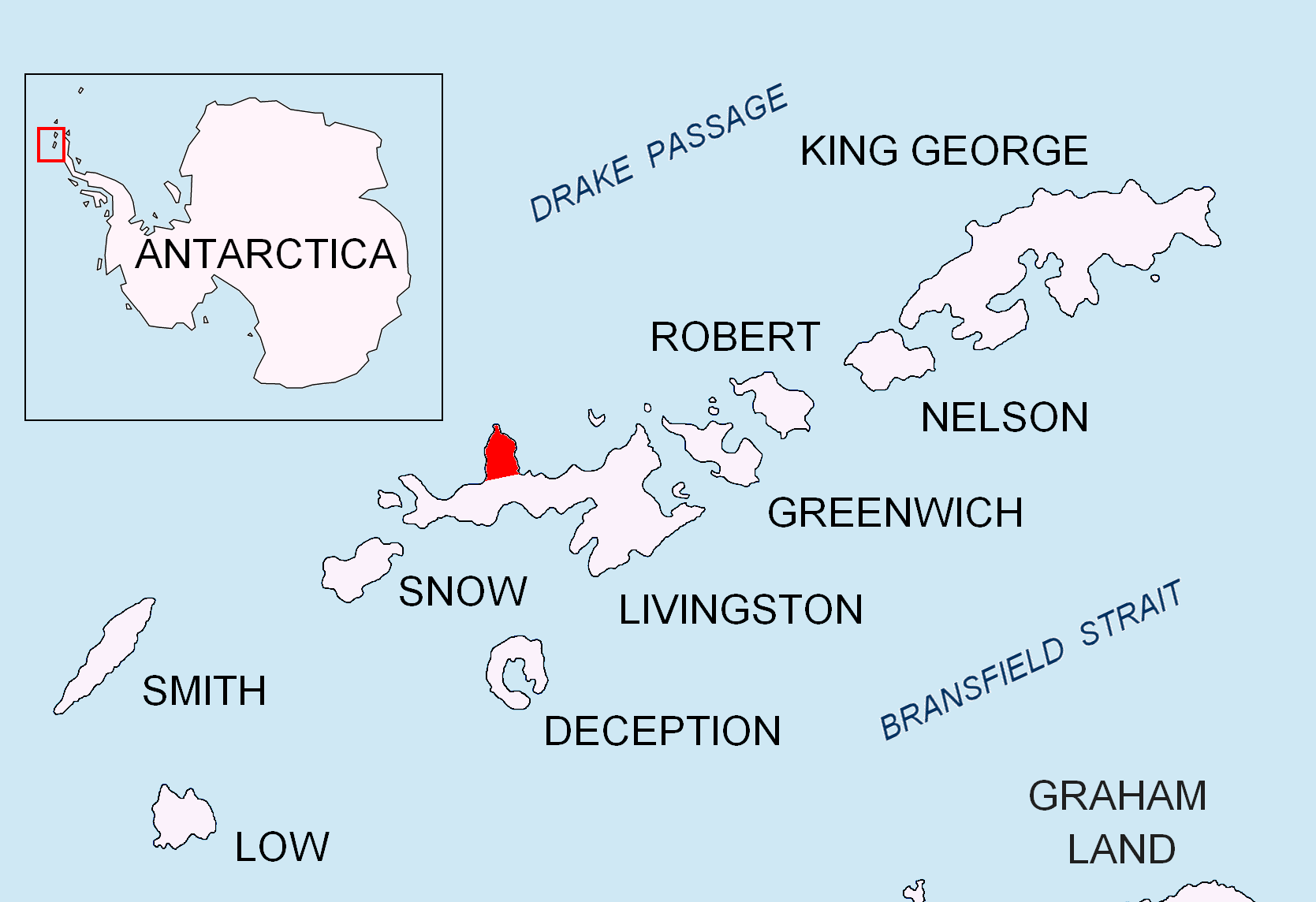
Location of Ioannes Paulus II Peninsula on Livingston Island in the South Shetland Islands

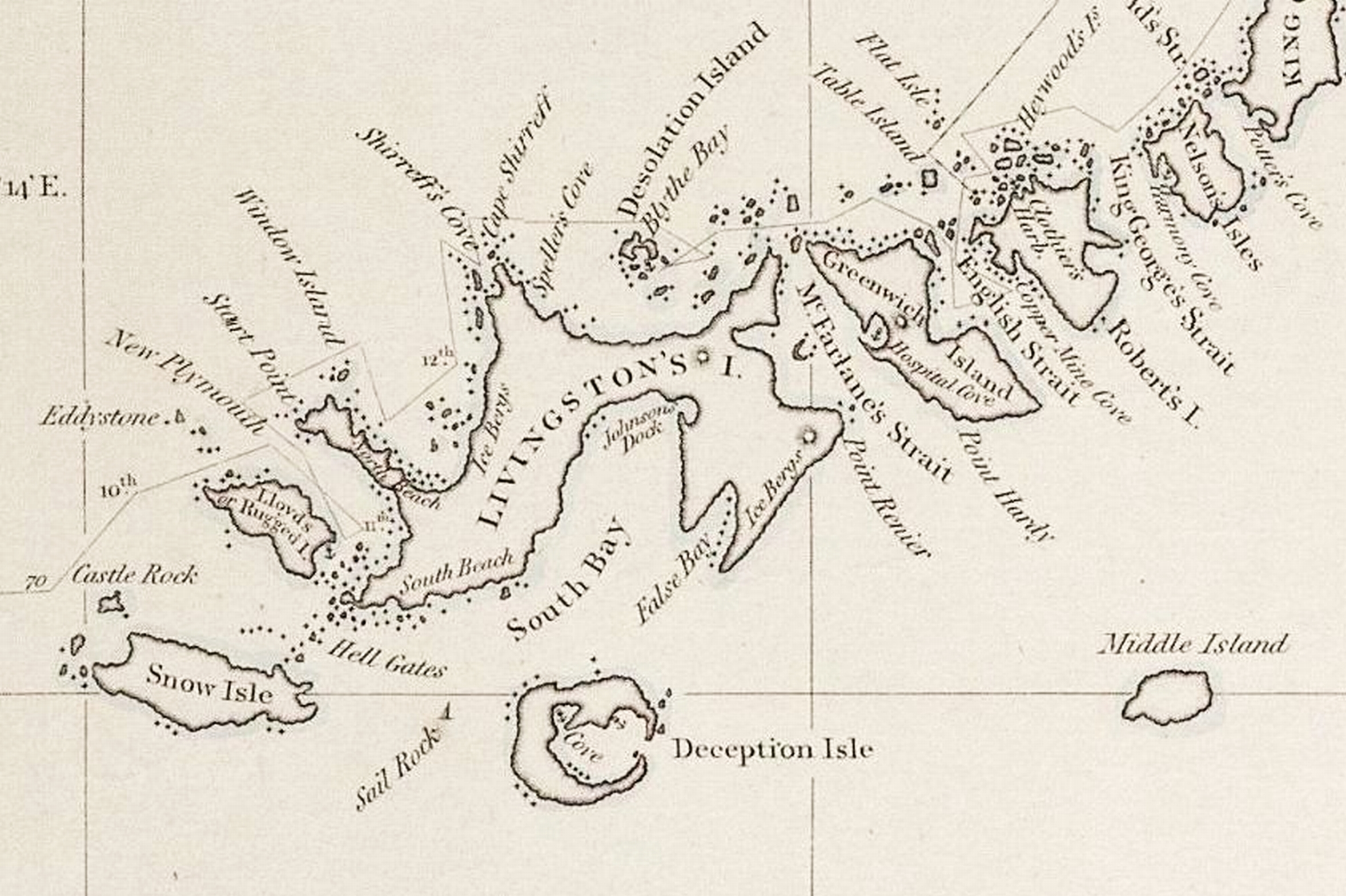
Fragment of George Powell's 1822 chart of the South Shetland Islands and South Orkney Islands featuring Shirreff Cove

Topographic map of Livingston Island

Shirreff Cove (62°28′S 60°48′W) is a small cove or anchorage, situated immediately southwest of Cape Shirreff between San Telmo Island and Gerlovo Beach on the northwest side of Ioannes Paulus II Peninsula, Livingston Island in the South Shetland Islands, Antarctica.

Edward Bransfield, Master, Royal Navy, named a cove in this vicinity for Captain William H. Shirreff, British commanding officer in the Pacific in 1820. Present application of the name is based upon the location shown on Captain George Powell's map, published by Laurie in 1822.

== Maps ==
- Chart of South Shetland including Coronation Island, &c. from the exploration of the sloop Dove in the years 1821 and 1822 by George Powell Commander of the same. Scale ca. 1:200000. London: Laurie, 1822.
- L.L. Ivanov et al. Antarctica: Livingston Island and Greenwich Island, South Shetland Islands. Scale 1:100000 topographic map. Sofia: Antarctic Place-names Commission of Bulgaria, 2005.
- L.L. Ivanov. Antarctica: Livingston Island and Greenwich, Robert, Snow and Smith Islands. Scale 1:120000 topographic map. Troyan: Manfred Wörner Foundation, 2009. ISBN 978-954-92032-6-4
- Protected area Cape Shirreff. Management Plan and Map.
