= San Telmo Island =

Island in Antarctica

- Location of Livingstone in the South Shetland Islands

- Location within Antarctic Peninsula Location within Antarctica

Geography
- Location: Antarctica
- Coordinates: 62°28′S 60°49′W
- Archipelago: South Shetland Islands
- Area: 22 ha (54 acres)

Administration
- Antarctica
- Administered under the Antarctic Treaty System

Demographics
- Population: uninhabited

Topographic map of Livingston Island.

San Telmo Island (a.k.a. Telmo Island) is an island forming the west side of Shirreff Cove on the north-west coast of Ioannes Paulus II Peninsula, Livingston Island in the South Shetland Islands of Antarctica. It has a surface area of 22 hectares (54 acres).

== History ==
Named by the UK-APC in 1958, 139 years after the Spanish vessel-ship of the line- San Telmo commanded by Captain Rosendo Porlier, which was the flagship of a Spanish naval squadron bound for Callao (Peru) to reinforce royalist forces there fighting the independence movements in Spanish America. Very severe weather was encountered in Drake Passage in about 61S, 60W, but hawser after hawser parted and she was ultimately left to her fate in about 62S. Some of her spars and her anchor-stock were found by sealers on nearby Half Moon Beach in about 1821.

== Antarctic Specially Protected Area ==
The island, along with nearby Cape Shirreff, has been designated an Antarctic Specially Protected Area (ASPA 149) for the diversity of its plant and animal life, especially its penguin and fur seal breeding colonies.

== See also ==
- Composite Antarctic Gazetteer
- List of Antarctic islands south of 60° S
- SCAR
- Territorial claims in Antarctica

== Map ==
- L.L. Ivanov et al., Antarctica: Livingston Island and Greenwich Island, South Shetland Islands (from English Strait to Morton Strait, with illustrations and ice-cover distribution), 1:100000 scale topographic map, Antarctic Place-names Commission of Bulgaria, Sofia, 2005
- Protected area Cape Shirreff. Management Plan and Map.
