= Rosendo Porlier y Asteguieta =

Spanish Navy officer

Rosendo Porlier y Asteguieta (1771 – 1819) was an officer of the Spanish Navy who was born in Lima and participated in the Peninsular War. Porlier Bay in Livingston Island, Antarctica, where he died, is named after him.

== See also ==
- San Telmo (ship)
- Spanish Navy
