= South Shetland Islands =

Group of islands north of the Antarctic Peninsula

- Map of the South Shetland Islands

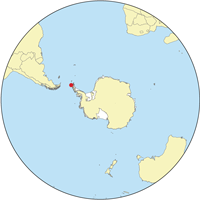
- Location of the South Shetlands

Geography
- Location: Antarctica
- Coordinates: 62°0′S 58°0′W
- Area: 3,687 km^{2} (1,424 sq mi)
- Highest elevation: 2,025 m (6644 ft)
- Highest point: Mount Foster

Administration
- Administered under the Antarctic Treaty System

Demographics
- Population: around 500
- Ethnic groups: mixed, others

The South Shetland Islands are a group of Antarctic islands located in the Drake Passage with a total area of 3,687 km^{2} (1,424 sq mi). They lie about 120 kilometres (65 nautical miles) north of the Antarctic Peninsula, and between 430 and 900 km (230 and 485 nmi) southwest of the nearest point of the South Orkney Islands. By the Antarctic Treaty of 1959, the islands' sovereignty is neither recognized nor disputed by the signatories. According to British government language on the topic, "the whole of Antarctica is protected in the interests of peace and science."

The islands have been claimed by three countries, beginning with the United Kingdom since 1908 (since 1962 as part of the equally unrecognized British Antarctic Territory). The islands are also claimed by the governments of Chile (since 1940, as part of the Antártica Chilena province), and by Argentina (since 1943, as part of Argentine Antarctica, Tierra del Fuego Province), both equally unrecognized.

Several countries maintain research stations on the islands. Most of them are situated on King George Island, benefitting from the airfield of the Chilean base Eduardo Frei.

Sixteen research stations are in different parts of the islands, with Chilean stations being the greatest in number.

== History ==
The islands were discovered by British mariner William Smith, in William, in 1819, although Dutch mariner Dirck Gerritsz in 1599 or Spanish Admiral Gabriel de Castilla in 1603 might have sighted the South Shetlands, or North or South American sealers might have visited the archipelago before Smith. Smith's discovery was well documented and had wider historical implications beyond its geographic significance.

Chilean scientists have claimed that Amerinds have visited the islands, due to stone artifacts recovered from bottom-sampling operations in Admiralty Bay, King George Island, and Discovery Bay, Greenwich Island; however, the artifacts – two arrowheads – were later found to have been planted. In 1818, Juan Pedro de Aguirre obtained permission from the Buenos Aires authorities to establish a base for sealing on "some of the uninhabited islands near the South Pole".

Captain William Smith in the British merchant brig Williams, while sailing to Valparaíso, Chile, in 1819, deviated from his route south of Cape Horn, and on 19 February 1819 sighted Williams Point, the northeast extremity of Livingston Island. Thus, Livingston Island became the first land ever discovered farther than 60° south. Smith revisited the South Shetlands, landed on King George Island on 16 October 1819, and claimed possession for Britain.

Meanwhile, the Spanish Navy ship San Telmo sank in September 1819 whilst trying to go through the Drake Passage. Parts of her presumed wreckage were found months later by sealers on the north coast of Livingston Island. The crew of San Telmo and the troops onboard, led by Brigadier Rosendo Porlier (a total of 644 men), are believed to be the first known humans to land in Antarctica.

From December 1819 to January 1820, the islands were surveyed and mapped by Lieutenant Edward Bransfield on board the Williams, which had been chartered by the Royal Navy.

On 15 November 1819, the United States agent in Valparaíso, Jeremy Robinson, informed the United States Secretary of State John Quincy Adams of Smith's discovery and Bransfield's forthcoming mission, and suggested dispatching a United States Navy ship to explore the islands, where "new sources of wealth, power, and happiness would be disclosed and science itself be benefited thereby".

The discovery of the islands attracted British and American sealers. The first sealing ship to operate in the area was the brig Espirito Santo, chartered by British merchants in Buenos Aires. The ship arrived at Rugged Island off Livingston Island, where its British crew landed on Christmas Day 1819, and claimed the islands for King George III. A narrative of the events was published by the brig's master, Joseph Herring, in the July 1820 edition of the Imperial Magazine. The Espirito Santo was followed from the Falkland Islands by the American brig Hersilia, commanded by Captain James Sheffield (with second mate Nathaniel Palmer), the first US sealer in the South Shetlands.

The first wintering over in Antarctica took place on the South Shetlands, when at the end of the 1820–1821 summer season, 11 British men from the ship Lord Melville failed to leave King George Island, and survived the winter to be rescued at the beginning of the next season.

Having circumnavigated the Antarctic continent, the Russian Antarctic Expedition of Fabian von Bellingshausen and Mikhail Lazarev arrived at the South Shetlands in January 1821. The Russians surveyed the islands and named them, landing on both King George Island and Elephant Island. While sailing between Deception and Livingston Islands, Bellingshausen was visited by Nathaniel Palmer, master of the American brig Hero, who informed him of the activities of dozens of American and British sealing ships in the area.

The name "New South Britain" was used briefly, but was soon changed to South Shetland Islands (in reference to the Shetland Islands in the north of Scotland). The name South Shetland Islands is now established in international usage. The two island groups lie at similar distances from the Equator; the Scottish Shetland Islands are 60°N, and warmed by the Gulf Stream, but the South Shetlands at 62°S are much colder.

Seal hunting and whaling were conducted on the islands during the 19th and early 20th centuries. The sealing era lasted from 1820 to 1908 during which time 197 vessels are recorded as having visiting the islands. Twelve of those vessels were wrecked. Relics of the sealing era include iron try pots, hut ruins, and inscriptions.

Beginning in 1908, the islands were governed as part of the Falkland Islands Dependency, but they have only been permanently occupied by humans since the establishment of a scientific research station in 1944. The archipelago, together with the nearby Antarctic Peninsula and South Georgia Island, is an increasingly popular tourist destination during the southern summer.

== Geography ==
As a group of islands, the South Shetland Islands are located at 62°0′S 58°0′W. They are within the region 61° 00'–63° 37' South, 53° 83'–62° 83' West. The islands lie 940 km (510 nmi) south of the Falkland Islands, and between 93 km (50 nmi) (Deception Island) and 269 km (145 nmi) (Clarence Island) northwest and north from the nearest point of the Antarctic continent, Graham Land.

The South Shetland Islands are a group of Antarctic islands, lying about 120 km (75 mi) north of the Antarctic Peninsula,

The South Shetlands consist of 11 major islands and several minor ones, totalling 3,687 km^{2} (1,424 sq mi) of land area. Between 80 and 90% of the land area is permanently glaciated. The highest point on the island chain is Mount Foster on Smith Island at 2,025 m (6,644 ft) above sea level at 2-meter spatial resolution.

The South Shetland Islands extend about 500 km (270 nmi) from Smith Island and Low Island in the west-southwest to Elephant Island and Clarence Island in the east-northeast.

Topographic map of Livingston, Greenwich, Robert, Snow and Smith Islands

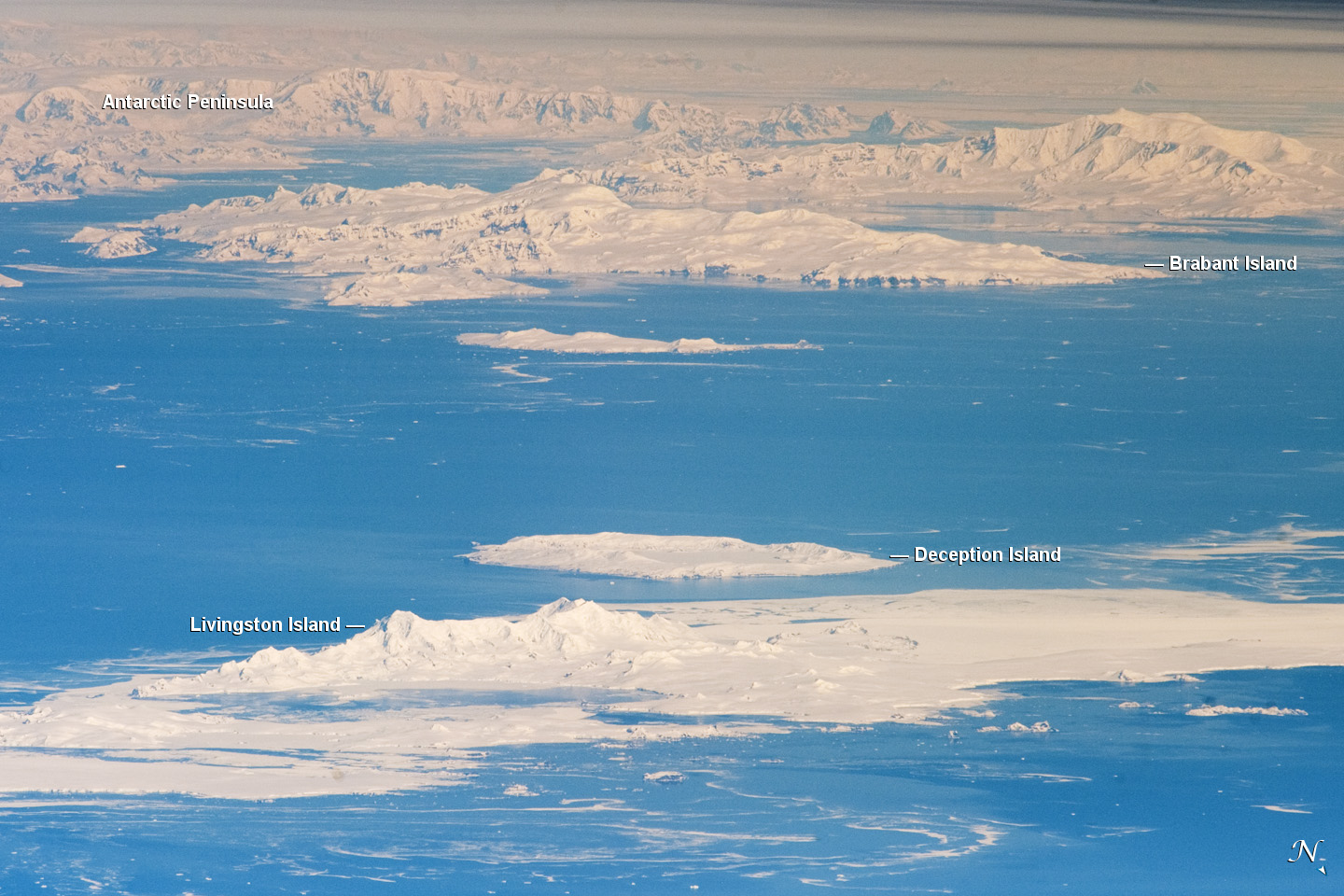
South Shetland Islands and Antarctic Peninsula, astronaut photo, 2011

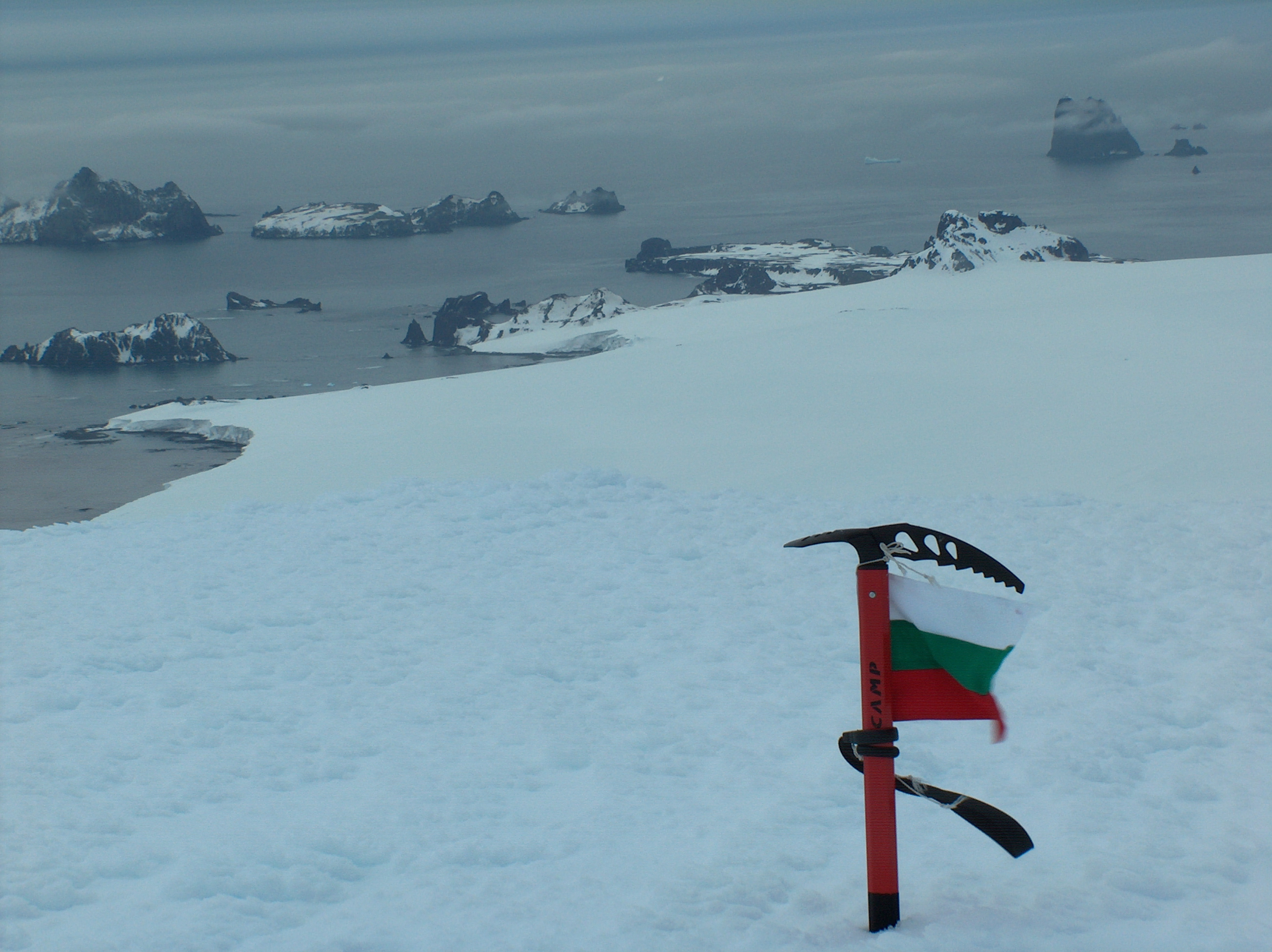
Williams Point, discovered on 19 February 1819

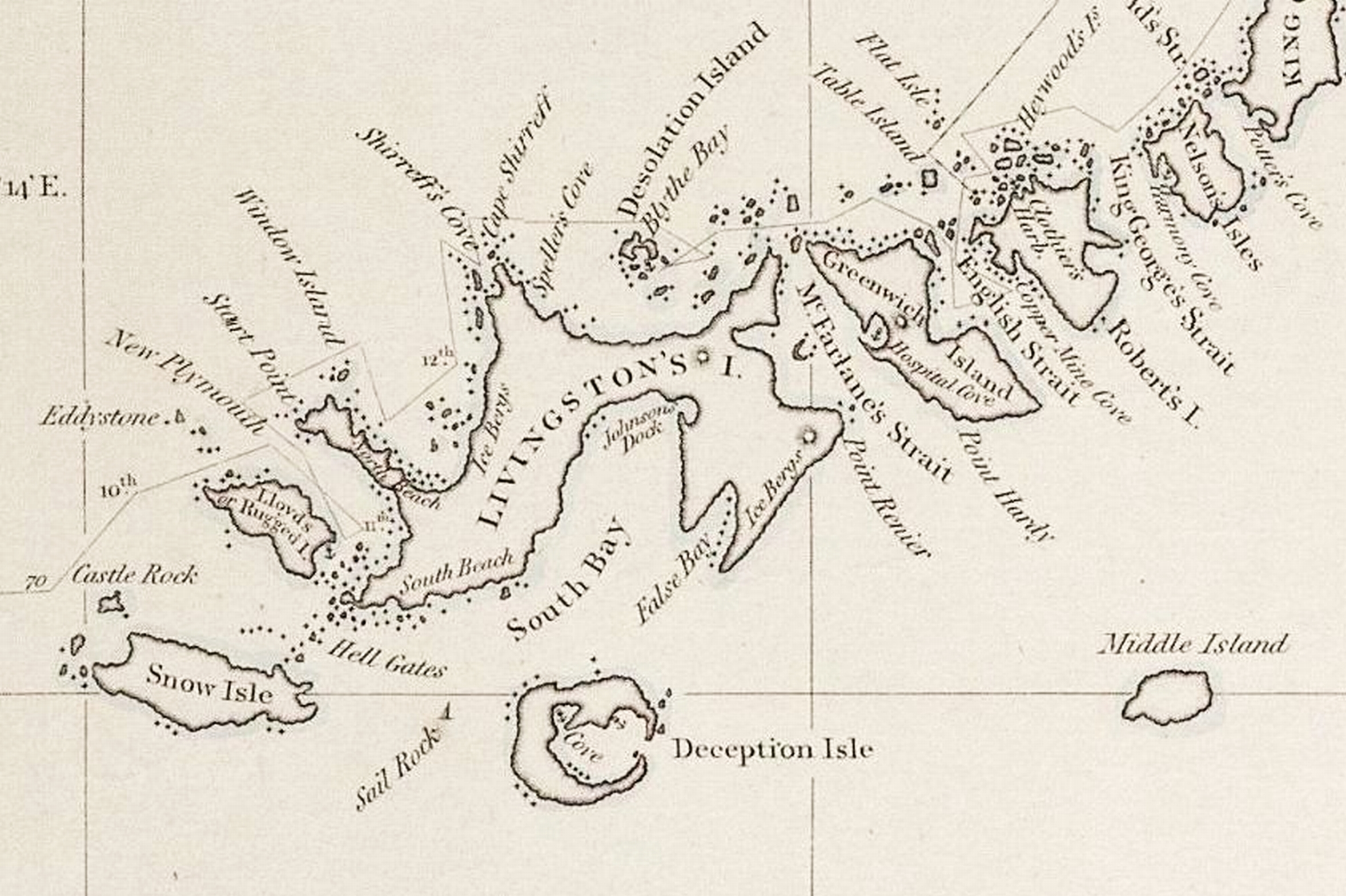
Fragment of George Powell's 1822 chart of the South Shetland Islands, with a phantom island on the bottom-right called "Middle Island".

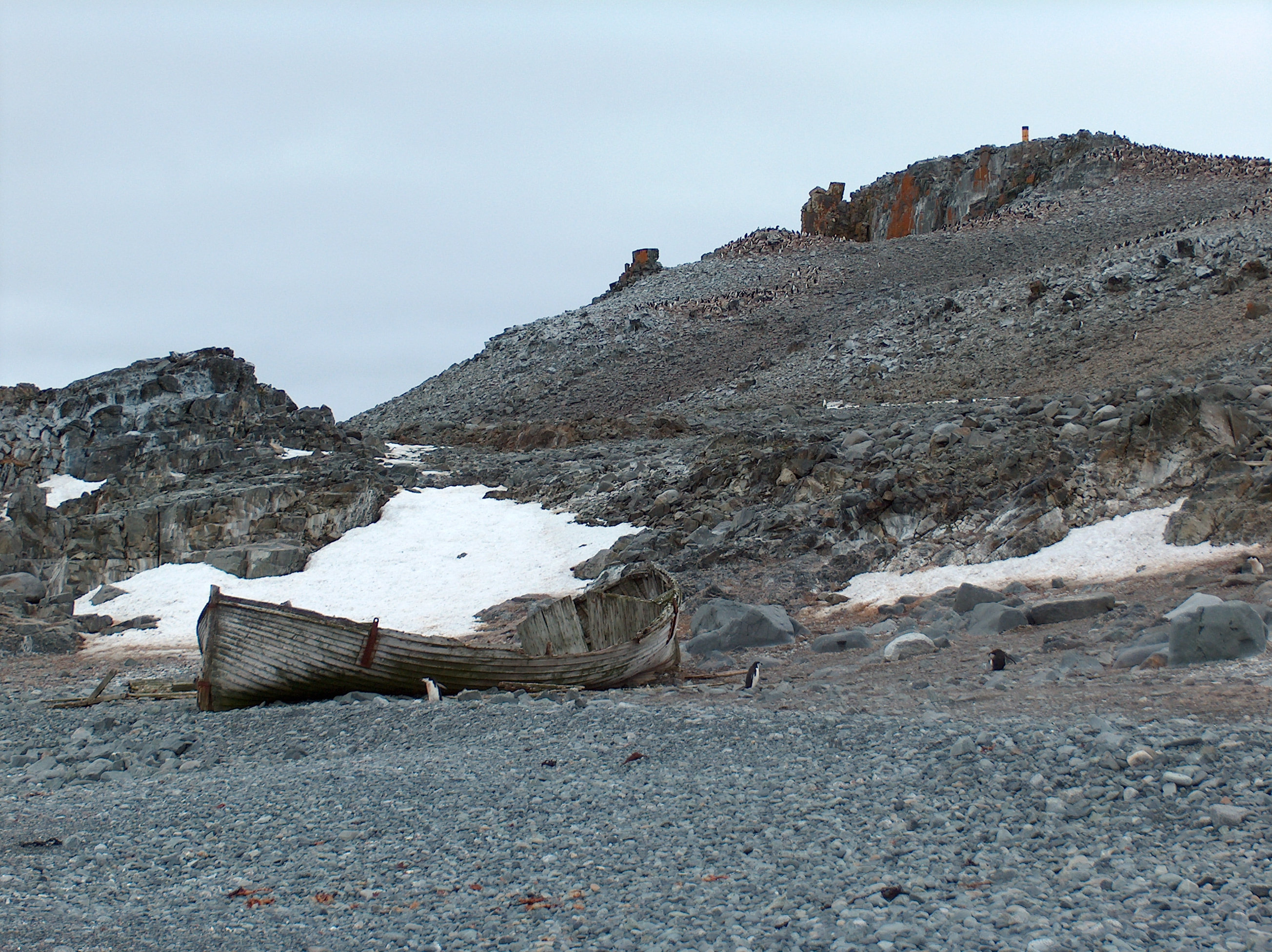
Norwegian whaling boat, Half Moon Island

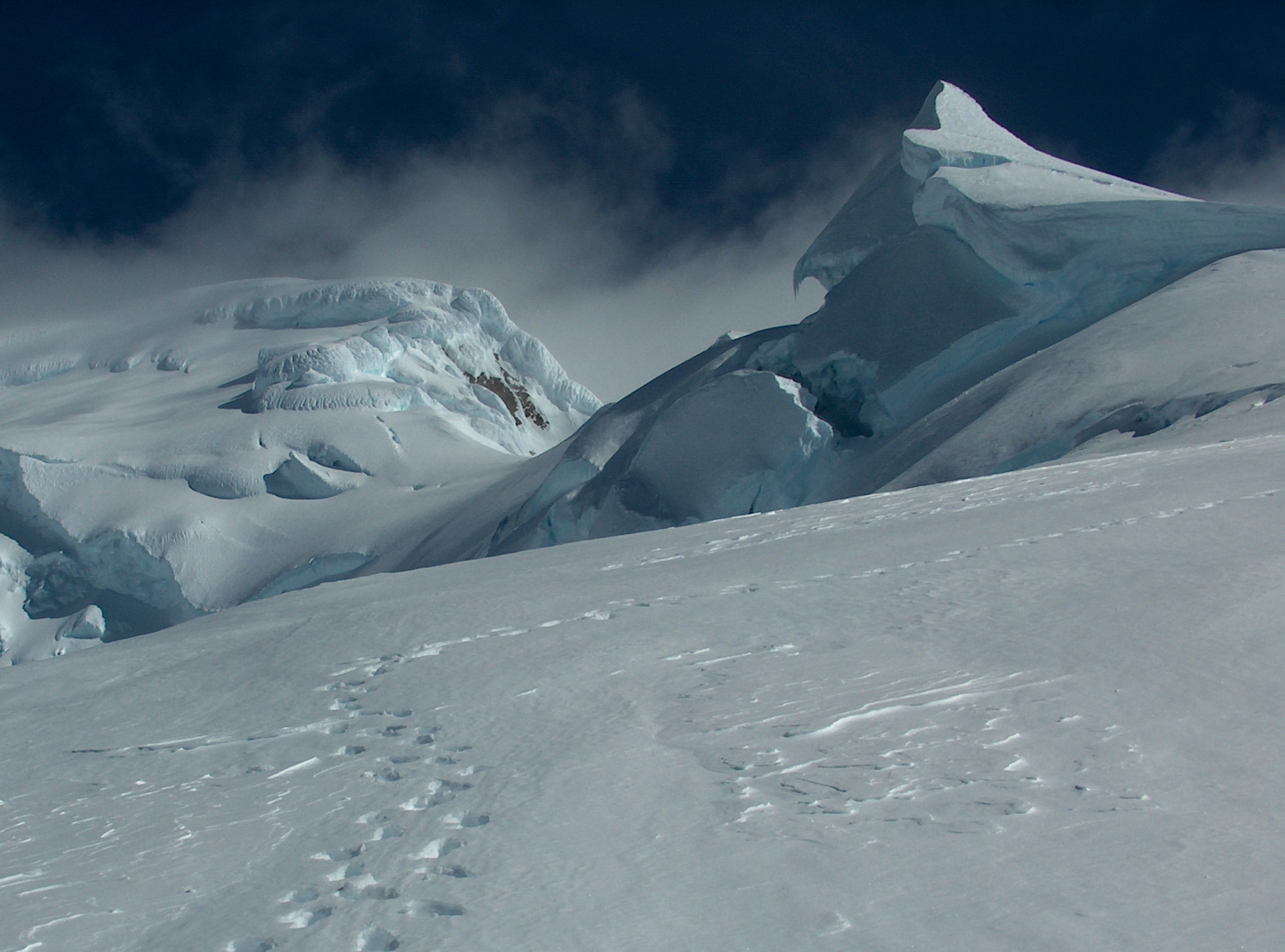
Ongal Peak, Tangra Mountains

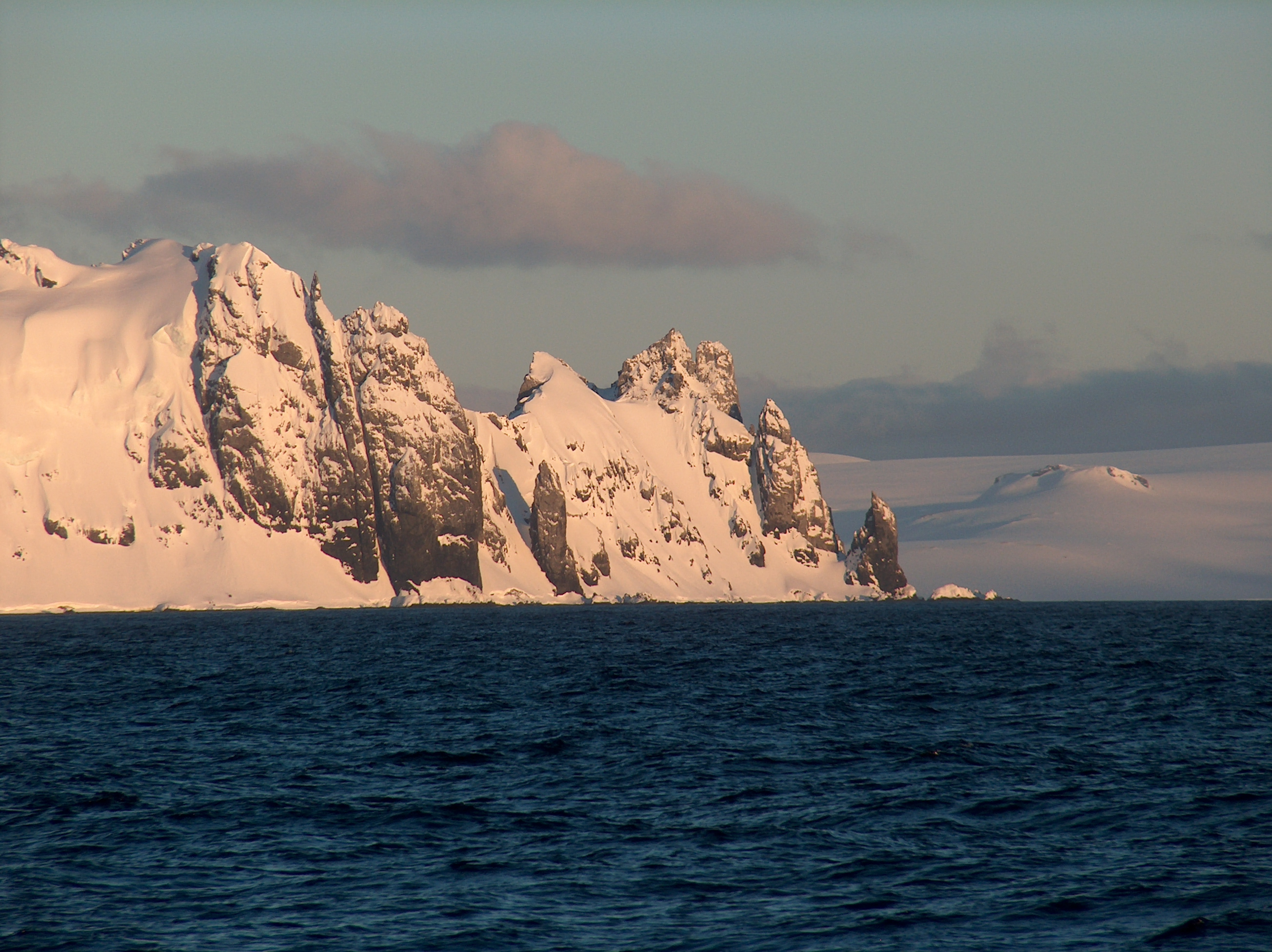
Renier Point

=== Volcanoes ===
Various volcanoes with activity in the Quaternary exist in the islands. These volcanoes are associated with the tectonics of Bransfield Rift. From west to east, the known volcanoes are Sail Rock, Deception Island, Rezen Knoll, Gleaner Heights, Edinburgh Hill, Inott Point, Penguin Island, Melville Peak, and Bridgeman Island. Most of the volcanic rock and tephra is of basalt or basaltic andesite. An exception is the tephra of Deception Island, which is of trachyte and basaltic trachyandesite, richer in potassium and sodium.

Quaternary volcanic products of the islands tend to have less potassium and sodium at a given silica range, and lower Nb/Y ratios, than those associated with the Larsen Rift on the Antarctic Peninisula.

=== Climate ===
The islands are the same distance from the Equator as the Faroe Islands in the North Atlantic, but their proximity to Antarctica means that they have a much colder climate. The sea around the islands is closed by ice from early April to early December, and the monthly average temperature is below 0 °C (32 °F) for eight months of the year (April to November).

The islands have experienced measurable glacier retreat during recent years, but despite this, they remain more than 80% snow- and ice-covered throughout the summer.

The climate is cloudy and humid all year round, and very strong westerly winds blow at all seasons. Some of the sunniest weather is associated with outbreaks of very cold weather from the south in late winter and spring. Mean summer temperatures are only about 1.5 °C (34.7 °F) and those in winter are about −5 °C (23 °F). The effect of the ocean tends to keep summer temperatures low and prevent winter temperatures from falling as low as they do inland to the south.

== Flora and fauna ==
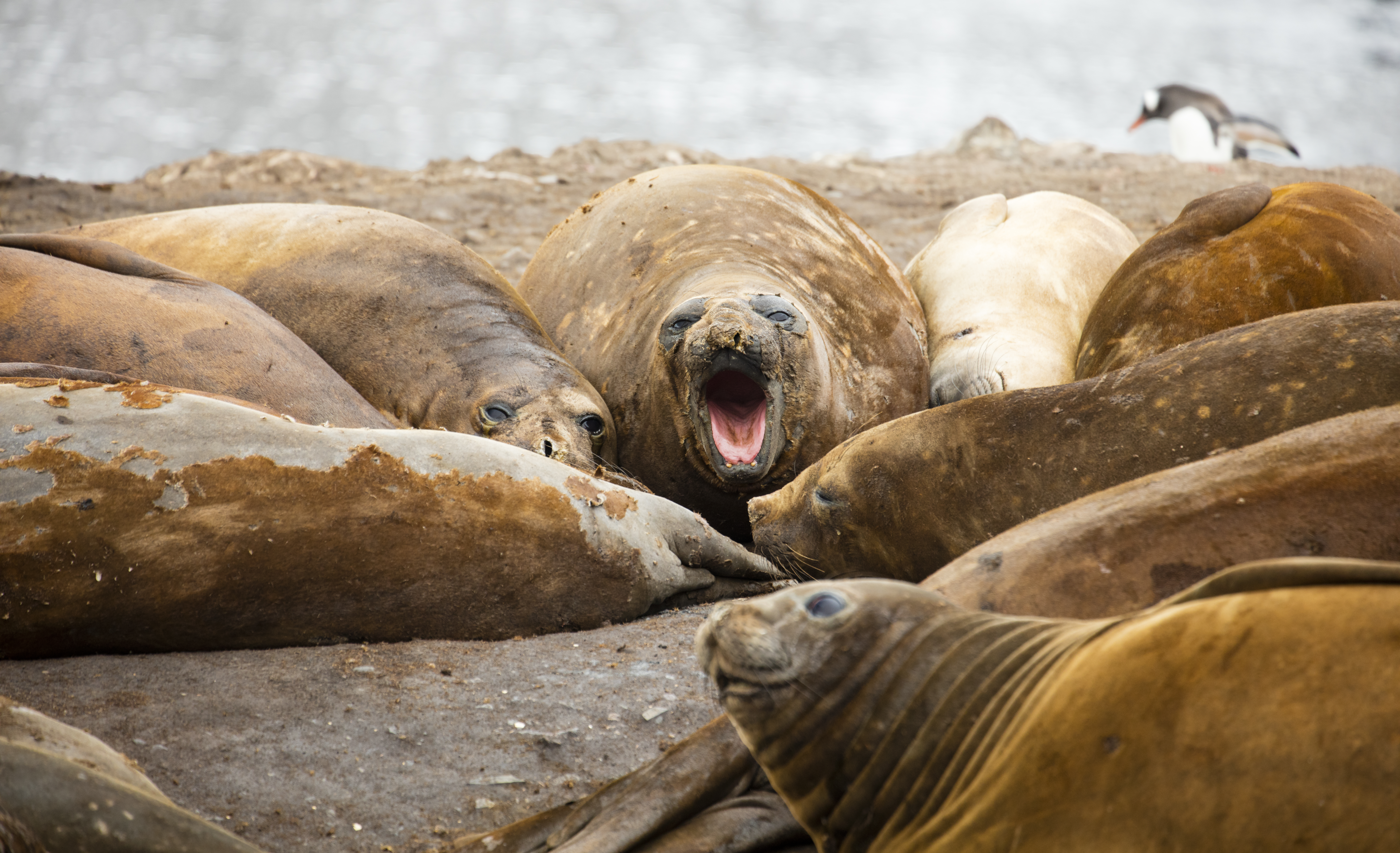
Elephant seals at Hannah Point

Despite the harsh conditions, the islands do support vegetation and are part of the Scotia Sea Islands tundra ecoregion, along with South Georgia and the South Sandwich Islands, the South Orkney Islands, and Bouvet Island. All of these islands lie in the cold seas below the Antarctic Convergence. These areas support tundra vegetation consisting of mosses, lichens, and algae, while seabirds, penguins, and seals feed in the surrounding waters.

An insect, Parochlus steinenii, is the only flying insect living that far south.

== Islands ==
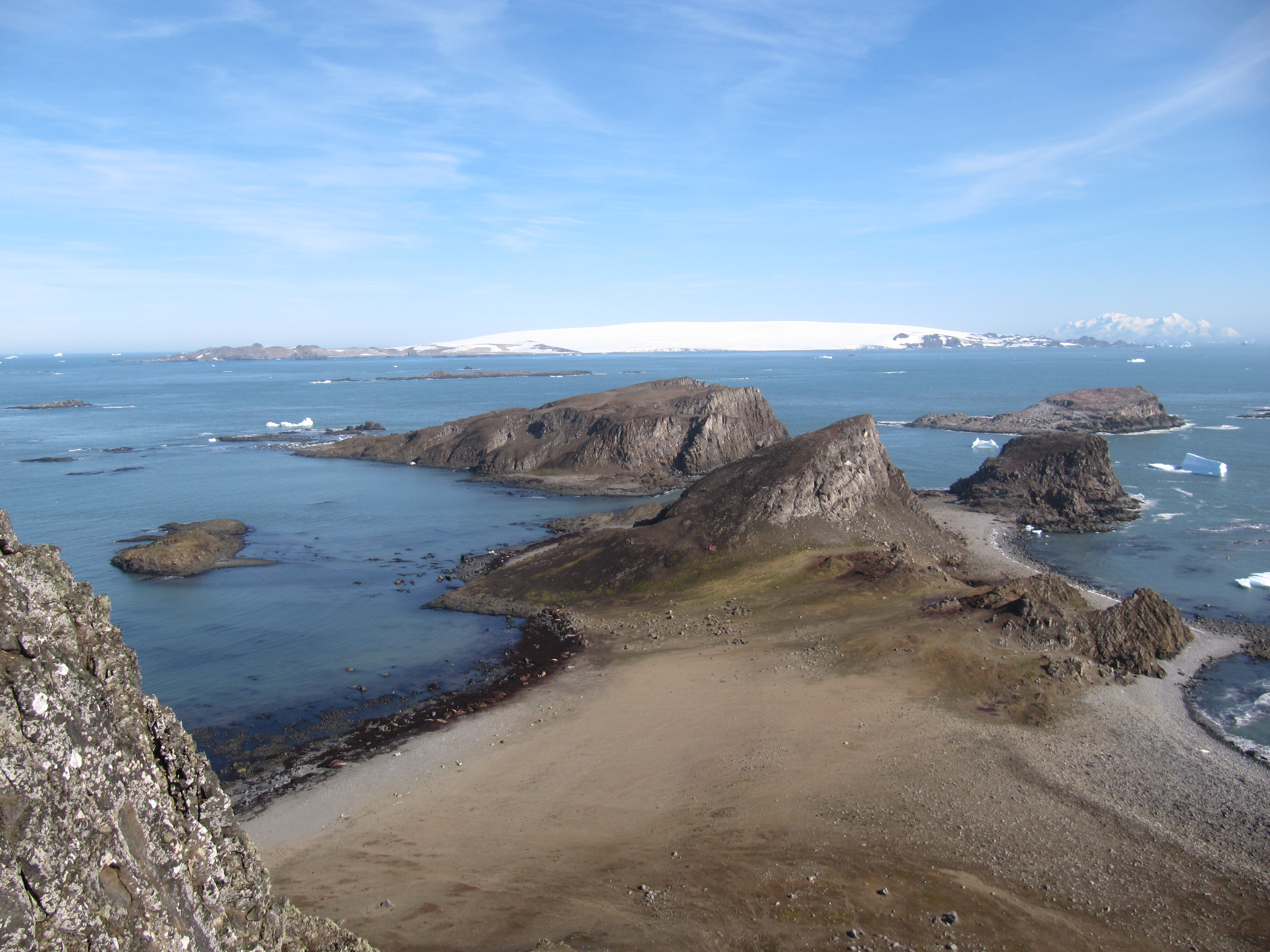
Devils Point, Livingston Island, with Morton Strait and Snow Island in the background, and Smith Island seen on the horizon on the right

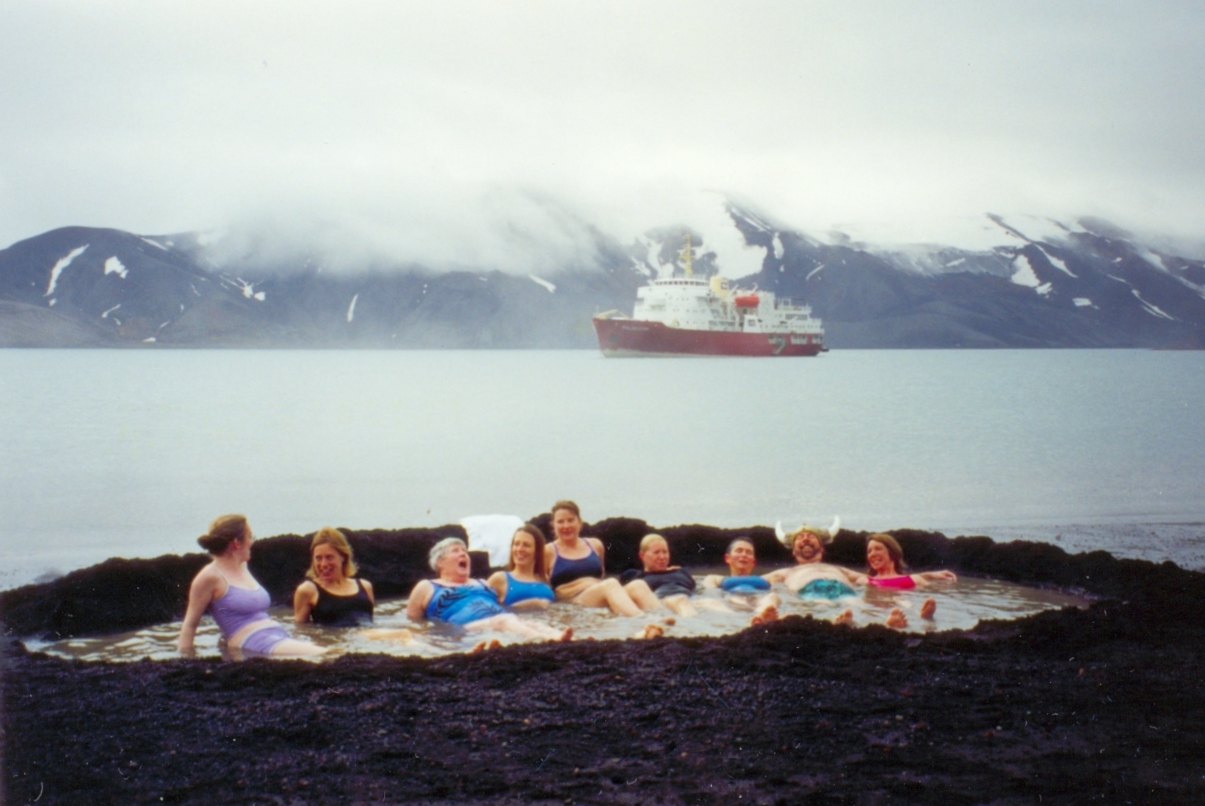
Warm volcanic bath at Port Foster, Deception Island. MV Explorer is in the background; she later sank after hitting an iceberg.

From north to south, the main and some minor islands of the South Shetlands are:

- Cornwallis Island (minor)
- Elephant Island (Mordvinova by Russia)
- Clarence Island (Shishkova by Russia)
- Rowett Island (minor)
- Gibbs Island (minor)
- Eadie Island (minor)
- King George Island (the largest, called May 25 island by Argentina, or Vaterloo by Russia)
- Bridgeman Island (minor)
- Penguin Island (minor—one of several Penguin Islands in the Antarctic region)
- Nelson Island (Leipzig by Russia)
- Robert Island (Polotsk by Russia)
- The Watchkeeper (minor)
- Table Island (minor)
- Aitcho Islands (minor)
- Greenwich Island (Berezina by Russia)
- Half Moon Island (minor)
- Desolation Island (minor)
- Livingston Island (second largest, Smolensk by Russia)
- Rugged Island (minor—one of several in the Antarctic region)
- Snow Island (one of several in the Antarctic region; Maly Yaroslavets by Russia)
- Smith Island (Borodino by Russia)
- Deception Island (Teylya by Russia)
- Low Island
- Seal Islands (minor)
- Middle Island (phantom)

The Atherton Islands consist of two islands lying four kilometres (two nautical miles) west-northwest of Bell Point, King George Island. The naming of these islands was approved on 1 January 1953 by the Advisory Committee on Antarctic Names. They were charted by Discovery Investigations in 1934–35 and are named after him.

See the "South Shetland Islands" navbar at the end of the article for a complete list of islands.

== Research stations ==
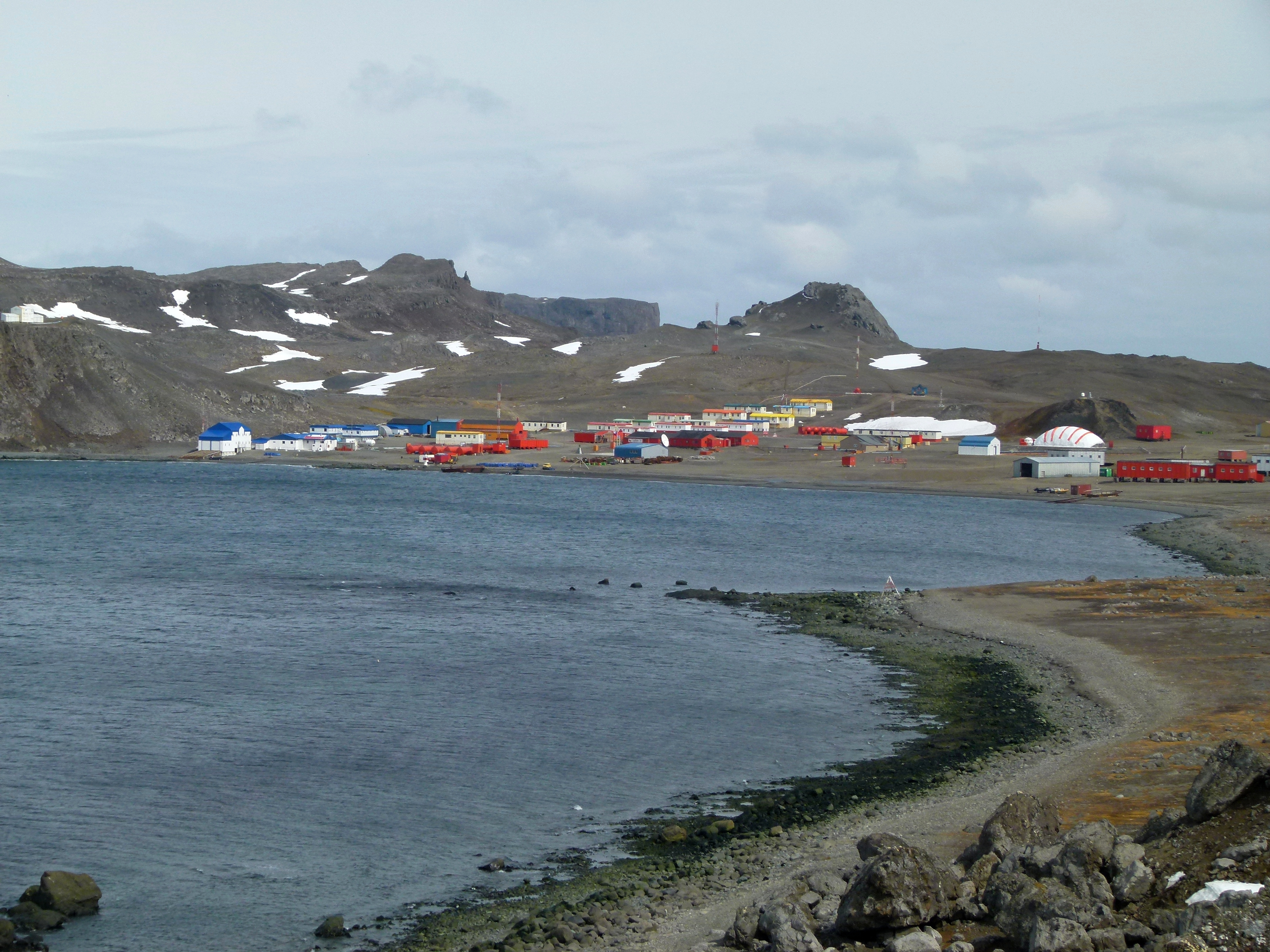
Chilean base Frei and Russian Bellingshausen (on the right)

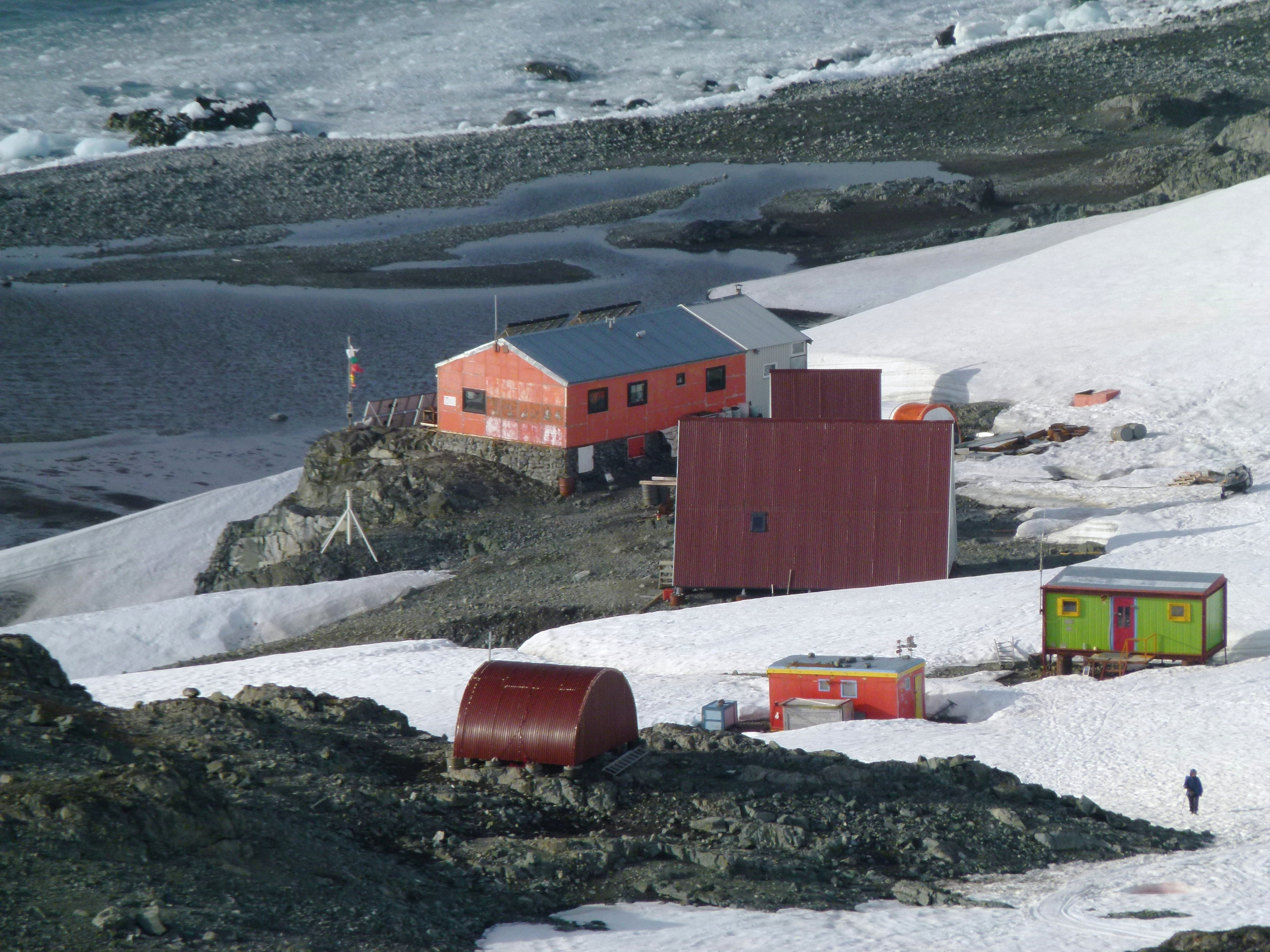
Bulgarian base Ohridski

Several nations maintain research stations on the Islands:

- Argentina: Cámara (since 1953, summer only)
- Argentina: Carlini (since 1953, year-round)
- Argentina: Base Decepción (since 1948, summer only)
- Bulgaria: St. Kliment Ohridski (since 1988, summer only)
- Brazil: Comandante Ferraz Antarctic Station (since 1984, year-round)
- Chile: Presidente Eduardo Frei Base (since 1969, year-round)
- Chile: Profesor Julio Escudero Base (since 1994, year-round)
- Chile: Captain Arturo Prat Base (since 1947, year-round)
- Chile: Dr. Guillermo Mann Base (since 1991, summer only)
- China: Chang Cheng/Great Wall (since 1985, year-round)
- Ecuador: Pedro Vicente Maldonado Base (since 1990, summer only)
- Spain: Juan Carlos I Antarctic Base (since 1988, summer only)
- Spain: Gabriel de Castilla Base (since 1989, summer only)
- South Korea: King Sejong Station (since 1988, year-round)
- Peru: Machu Picchu Research Station (since 1989, summer only)
- Poland: Henryk Arctowski Polish Antarctic Station (since 1977, year-round)
- Russia: Bellingshausen Station (since 1968, year-round)
- United States: Shirreff Base (since 1996, summer only)
- Uruguay: Artigas Base (since 1984, year-round)

== Field camps ==
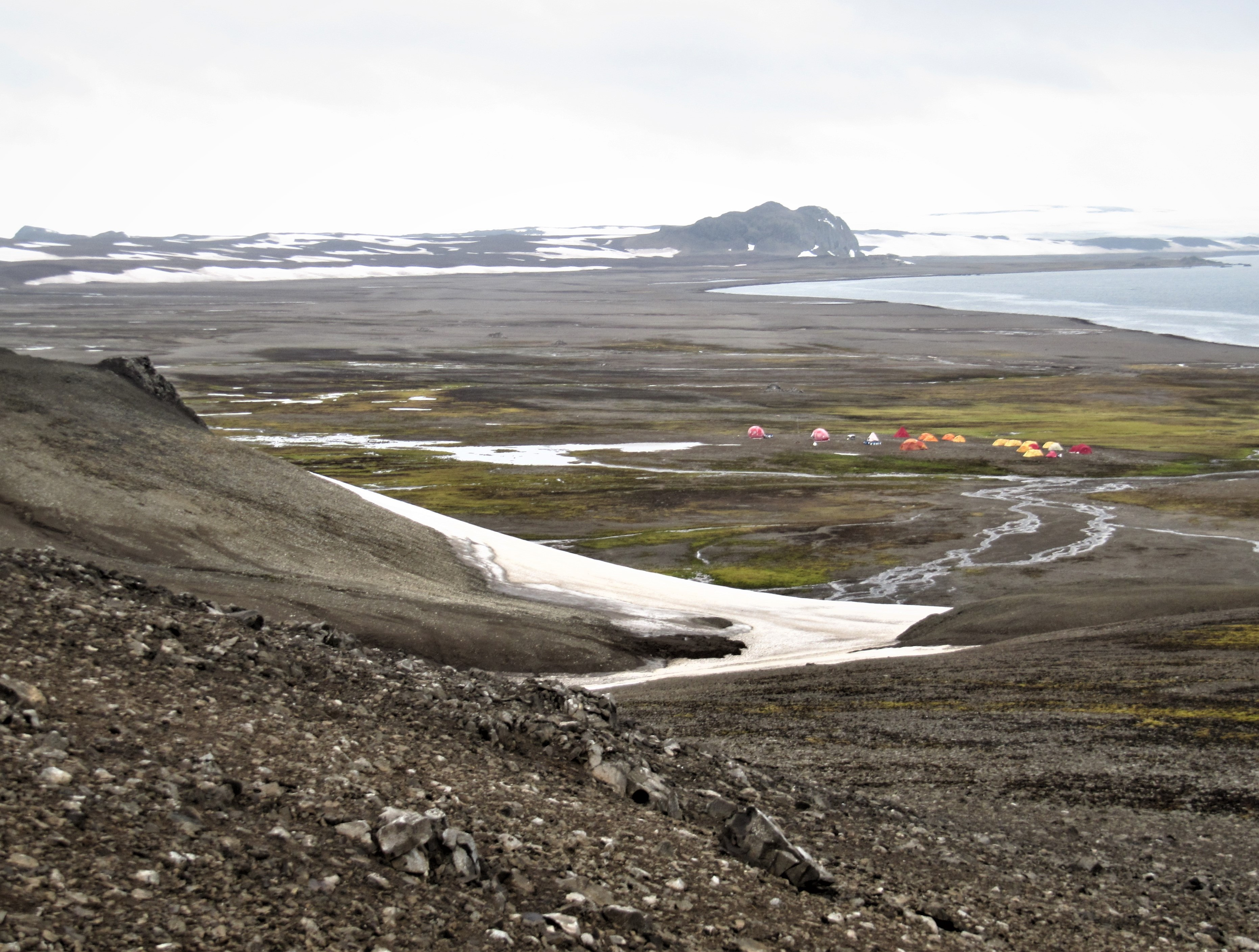
Camp Byers (International Field Camp)

- Argentina: Camp Livingston
- Bulgaria: Camp Academia
- Spain: Camp Byers

== See also ==
- Cape Plenty
- Composite Gazetteer of Antarctica – Authoritative international gazetteer containing all the Antarctic toponyms
- Deception Island – Active volcanic island in the South Shetland archipelago
- Greenwich Island – Island of the South Shetland Islands, Antarctica
- King George Island – Island of the South Shetland Islands
- List of Antarctic and subantarctic islands
- Livingston Island – Island in Antarctica
- Scientific Committee on Antarctic Research – British organization
- Sherratt Bay – Bay in the South Shetland Islands
- Territorial claims in Antarctica
- Shetland Plate – Tectonic microplate off the tip of the Antarctic Peninsula
- Stancomb Cove
- Stanley Patch
- Stump Rock
- Wensleydale Beacon

== In fiction ==
- Away with the Penguins by Hazel Prior (2020) is set in a penguin research base on the fictional island of "Locket Island", but which the author states is based on the South Shetland Islands.
