= Montana Bluff =

Ice-covered peak in Antarctica

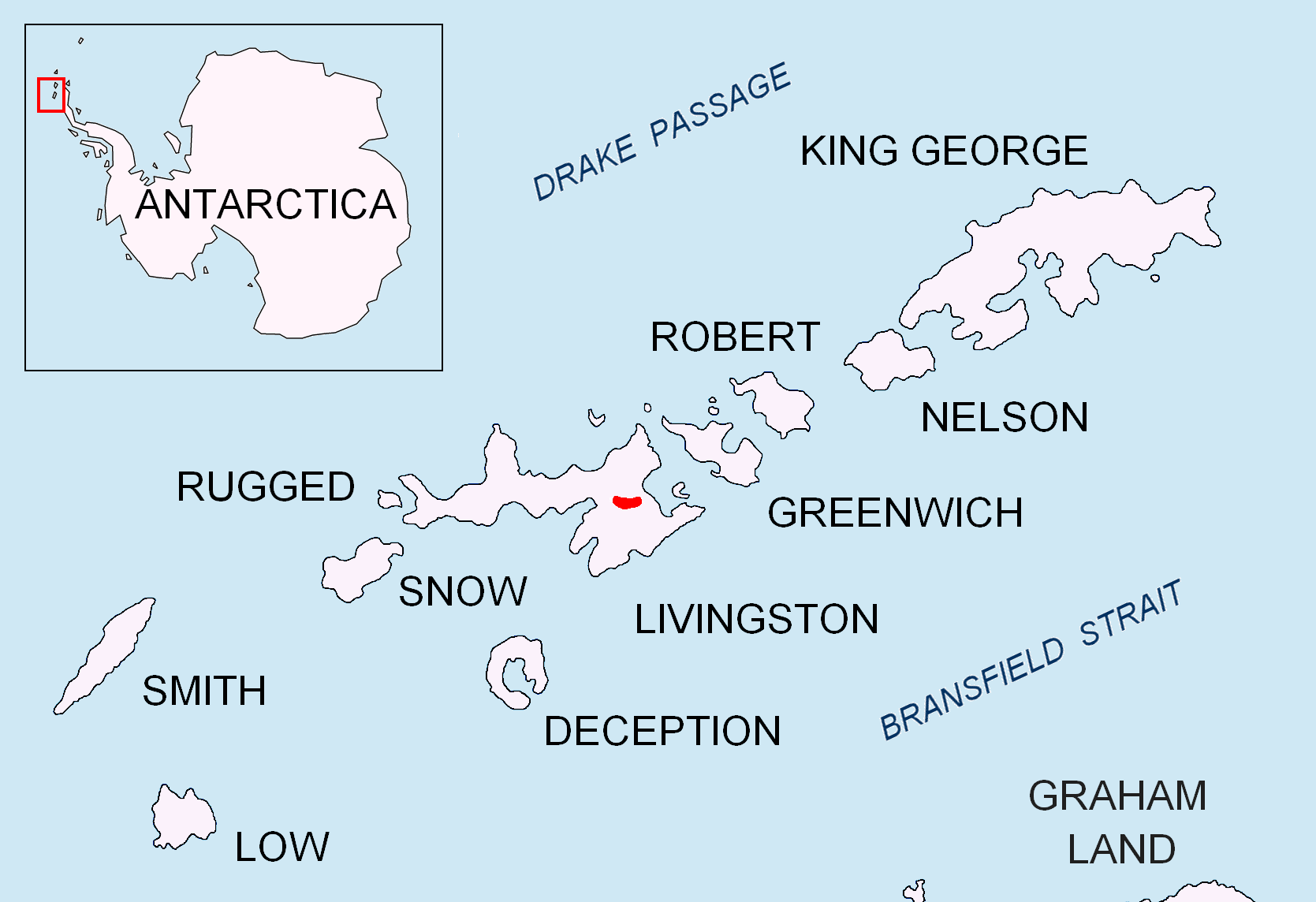
Location of Bowles Ridge on Livingston Island in the South Shetland Islands

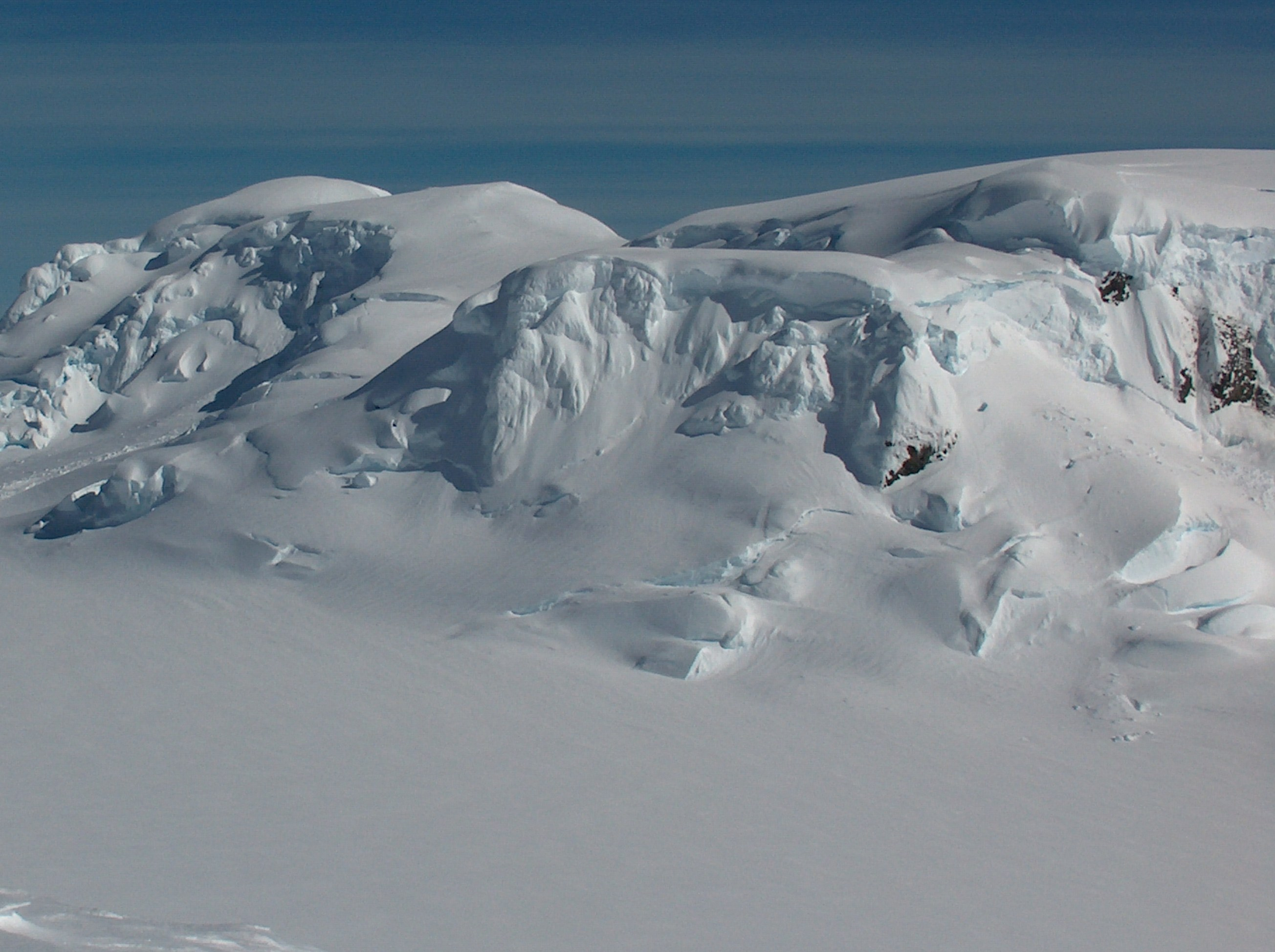
Montana Bluff from Kuzman Knoll

Topographic map of Livingston Island and Smith Island

Montana Bluff (Bulgarian: връх Монтана, romanized: vrah Montana, IPA: [ˈvrɤx monˈtanɐ]) is an ice-covered peak rising to 670 m at the end of a side ridge running south-southeast from Ticha Peak in central Bowles Ridge, Livingston Island. Surmounting Perunika Glacier to the west and southwest, and Huron Glacier to the east and southeast. It is named after the city of Montana in Northwestern Bulgaria.

== Location ==
The bluff is located at 62°37′24″S 60°10′56″W which is next east of the south entrance of Omurtag Pass, 820 m south of Ticha Peak, 2.3 km west-southweat of Maritsa Peak, 1.77 km northwest of Kuzman Knoll, and 3.8 km northeast of Orpheus Gate (Bulgarian topographic survey Tangra 2004/05).

== Maps ==
- L.L. Ivanov et al. Antarctica: Livingston Island and Greenwich Island, South Shetland Islands. Scale 1:100000 topographic map. Sofia: Antarctic Place-names Commission of Bulgaria, 2005.
- L.L. Ivanov. Antarctica: Livingston Island and Greenwich, Robert, Snow and Smith Islands. Scale 1:120000 topographic map. Troyan: Manfred Wörner Foundation, 2009.
- A. Kamburov and L. Ivanov. Bowles Ridge and Central Tangra Mountains: Livingston Island, Antarctica. Scale 1:25000 map. Sofia: Manfred Wörner Foundation, 2023. ISBN 978-619-90008-6-1
