= Ticha Peak =

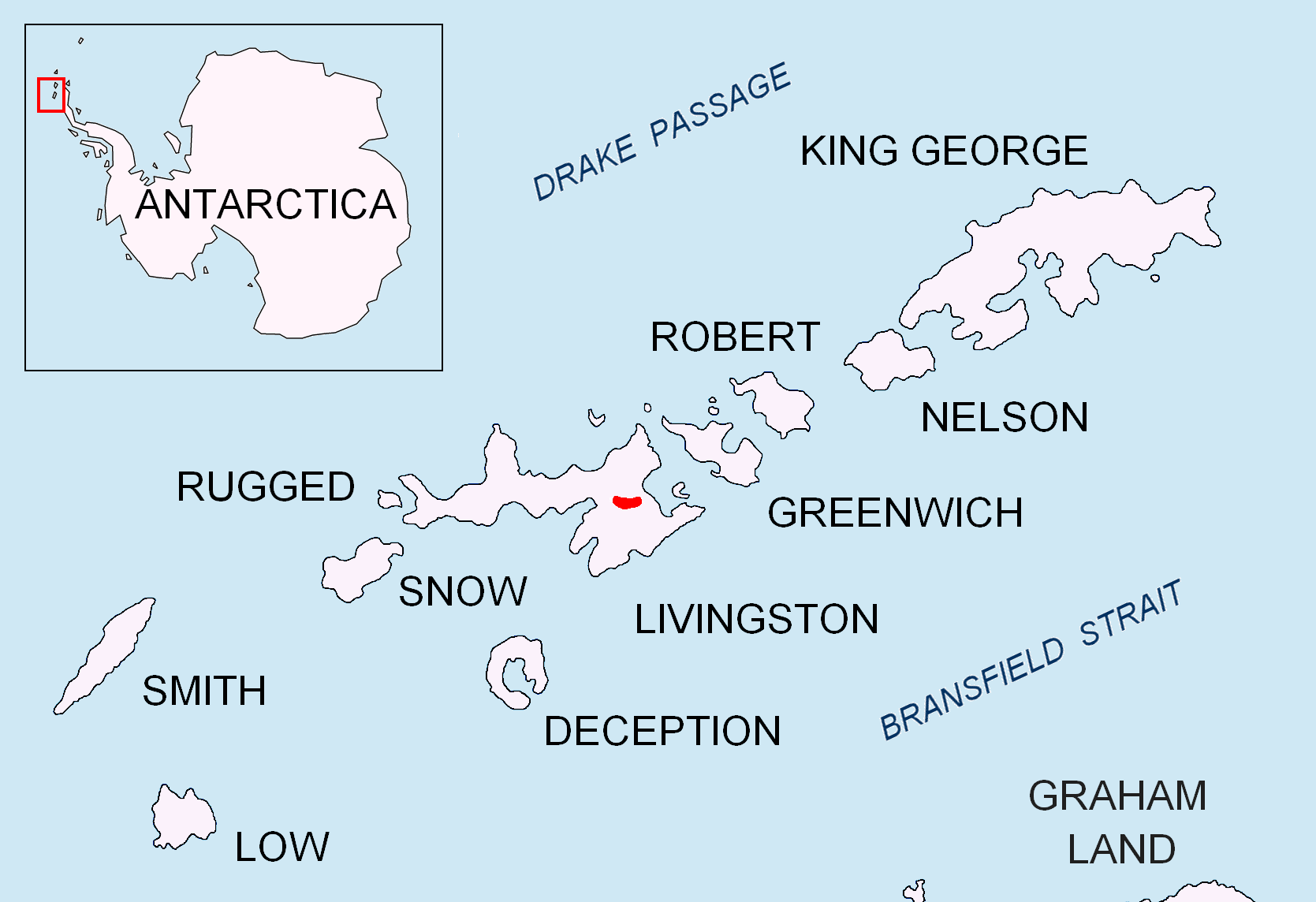
Location of Bowles Ridge on Livingston Island in the South Shetland Islands.

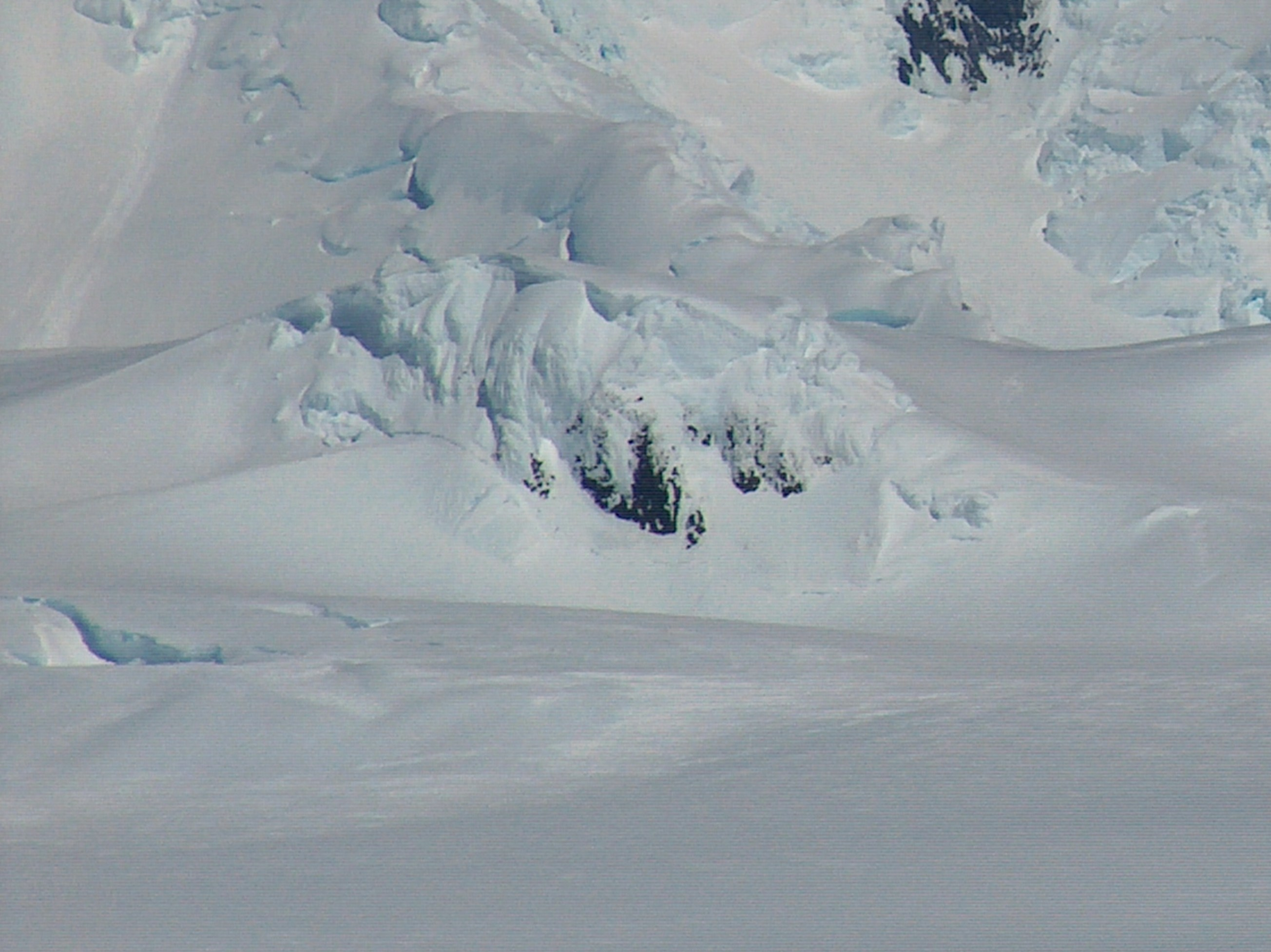
Ticha Peak from Zemen Knoll.

Topographic map of Livingston Island, Greenwich, Robert, Snow and Smith Islands.

Ticha Peak (Bulgarian: връх Тича, romanized: vrah Ticha, IPA: [ˈvrɤx ˈtit͡ʃɐ]) is a 790 m peak on the east side of Omurtag Pass in Bowles Ridge, Livingston Island in the South Shetland Islands, Antarctica. The peak is overlooking Perunika Glacier and Wörner Gap to the southwest, Huron Glacier to the southeast, and Kaliakra Glacier to the north.

The feature is named after Ticha River in Northeastern Bulgaria.

== Location ==
The peak is located at 62°36′58″S 60°11′07″W, which is 880 m east of the summit Mount Bowles, 5.35 km south of Leslie Hill, 2.29 km southwest of Melnik Peak, 400 m west of Petrich Peak, 1.65 km west of Asparuh Peak and 2.52 km northwest of Kuzman Knoll (Bulgarian topographic survey Tangra 2004/05, and mapping in 2005 and 2009).

== Maps ==
- L.L. Ivanov et al. Antarctica: Livingston Island and Greenwich Island, South Shetland Islands. Scale 1:100000 topographic map. Sofia: Antarctic Place-names Commission of Bulgaria, 2005.
- L.L. Ivanov. Antarctica: Livingston Island and Greenwich, Robert, Snow and Smith Islands. Scale 1:120000 topographic map. Troyan: Manfred Wörner Foundation, 2009. ISBN 978-954-92032-6-4
- A. Kamburov and L. Ivanov. Bowles Ridge and Central Tangra Mountains: Livingston Island, Antarctica. Scale 1:25000 map. Sofia: Manfred Wörner Foundation, 2023. ISBN 978-619-90008-6-1
