= Maritsa Peak =

Cliff in the South Shetland Islands, Antarctica

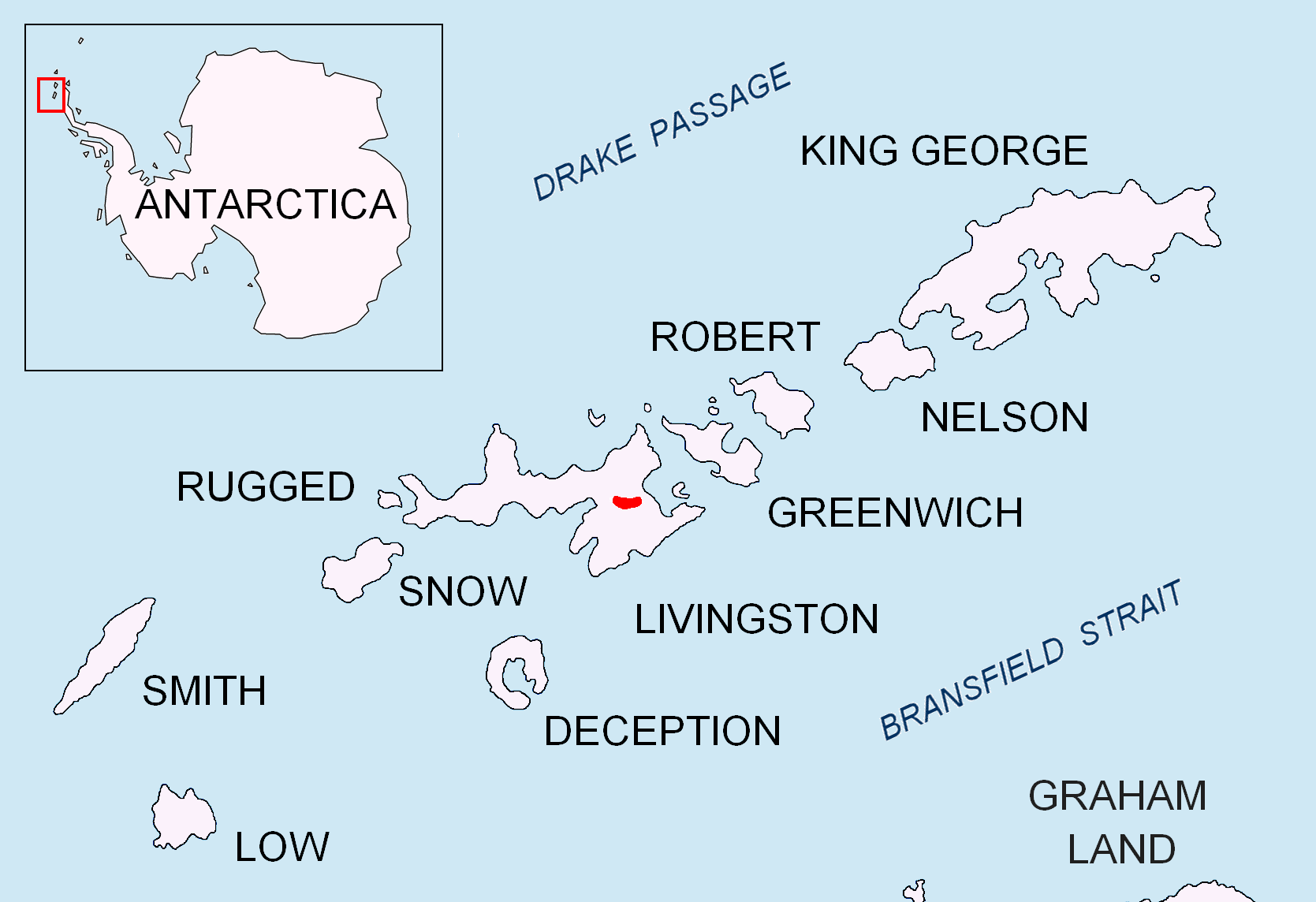
Location of Bowles Ridge on Livingston Island in the South Shetland Islands.

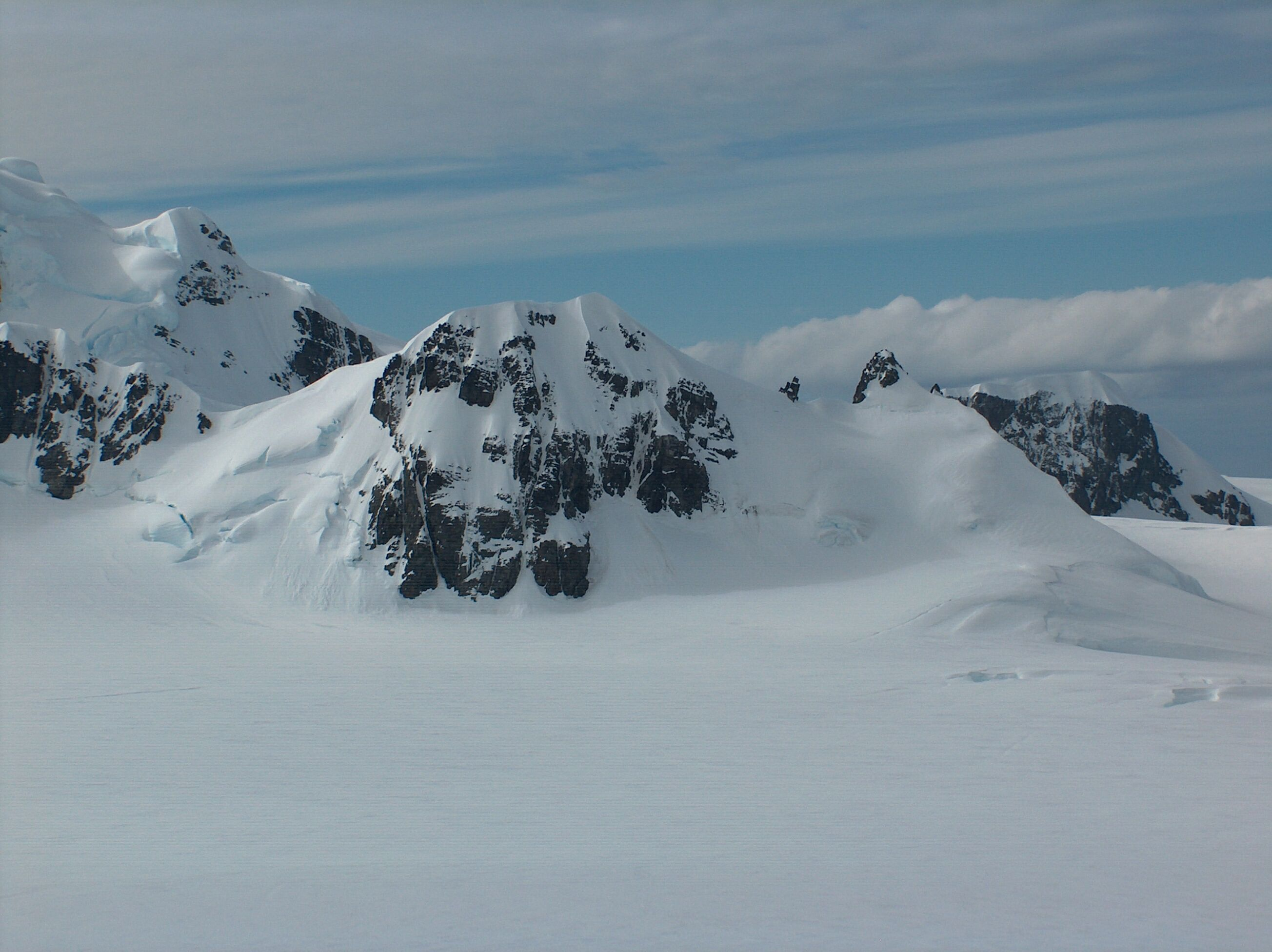
Maritsa Peak from Erma Knoll.

Topographic map of Livingston Island

Maritsa Peak (Bulgarian: връх Марица, romanized: vrah Maritsa, IPA: [ˈvrɤx mɐˈrit͡sɐ]) rises to 560 m (1,840 ft) in eastern Bowles Ridge on Livingston Island in the South Shetland Islands, Antarctica. It has precipitous rocky south slopes, and is situated on the west side of Pirdop Gate, surmounting Huron Glacier to the south and Struma Glacier to the north. The peak is "named after the Maritsa River in Bulgaria."

== Location ==
The cliff is located at 62°37′04″S 60°08′17″W which is 3.3 km east of Mount Bowles, 970 m southeast of Asparuh Peak, 1.18 km west-southwest of Atanasoff Nunatak, 2.48 km north of Aheloy Nunatak and 2.37 km northeast of Kuzman Knoll. Bulgarian topographic survey Tangra 2004/05 and mapping in 2005 and 2009.

== Maps ==
- South Shetland Islands. Scale 1:200000 topographic map. DOS 610 Sheet W 62 60. Tolworth, UK, 1968.
- Islas Livingston y Decepción. Mapa topográfico a escala 1:100000. Madrid: Servicio Geográfico del Ejército, 1991.
- S. Soccol, D. Gildea and J. Bath. Livingston Island, Antarctica. Scale 1:100000 satellite map. The Omega Foundation, USA, 2004.
- L.L. Ivanov et al., Antarctica: Livingston Island and Greenwich Island, South Shetland Islands (from English Strait to Morton Strait, with illustrations and ice-cover distribution), 1:100000 scale topographic map, Antarctic Place-names Commission of Bulgaria, Sofia, 2005
- L.L. Ivanov. Antarctica: Livingston Island and Greenwich, Robert, Snow and Smith Islands. Scale 1:120000 topographic map. Troyan: Manfred Wörner Foundation, 2010. ISBN 978-954-92032-9-5 (First edition 2009. ISBN 978-954-92032-6-4)
- Antarctic Digital Database (ADD). Scale 1:250000 topographic map of Antarctica. Scientific Committee on Antarctic Research (SCAR). Since 1993, regularly upgraded and updated.
- L.L. Ivanov. Antarctica: Livingston Island and Smith Island. Scale 1:100000 topographic map. Manfred Wörner Foundation, 2017. ISBN 978-619-90008-3-0
- A. Kamburov and L. Ivanov. Bowles Ridge and Central Tangra Mountains: Livingston Island, Antarctica. Scale 1:25000 map. Sofia: Manfred Wörner Foundation, 2023. ISBN 978-619-90008-6-1
