= Aheloy Nunatak =

Antarctic Island mountain peak

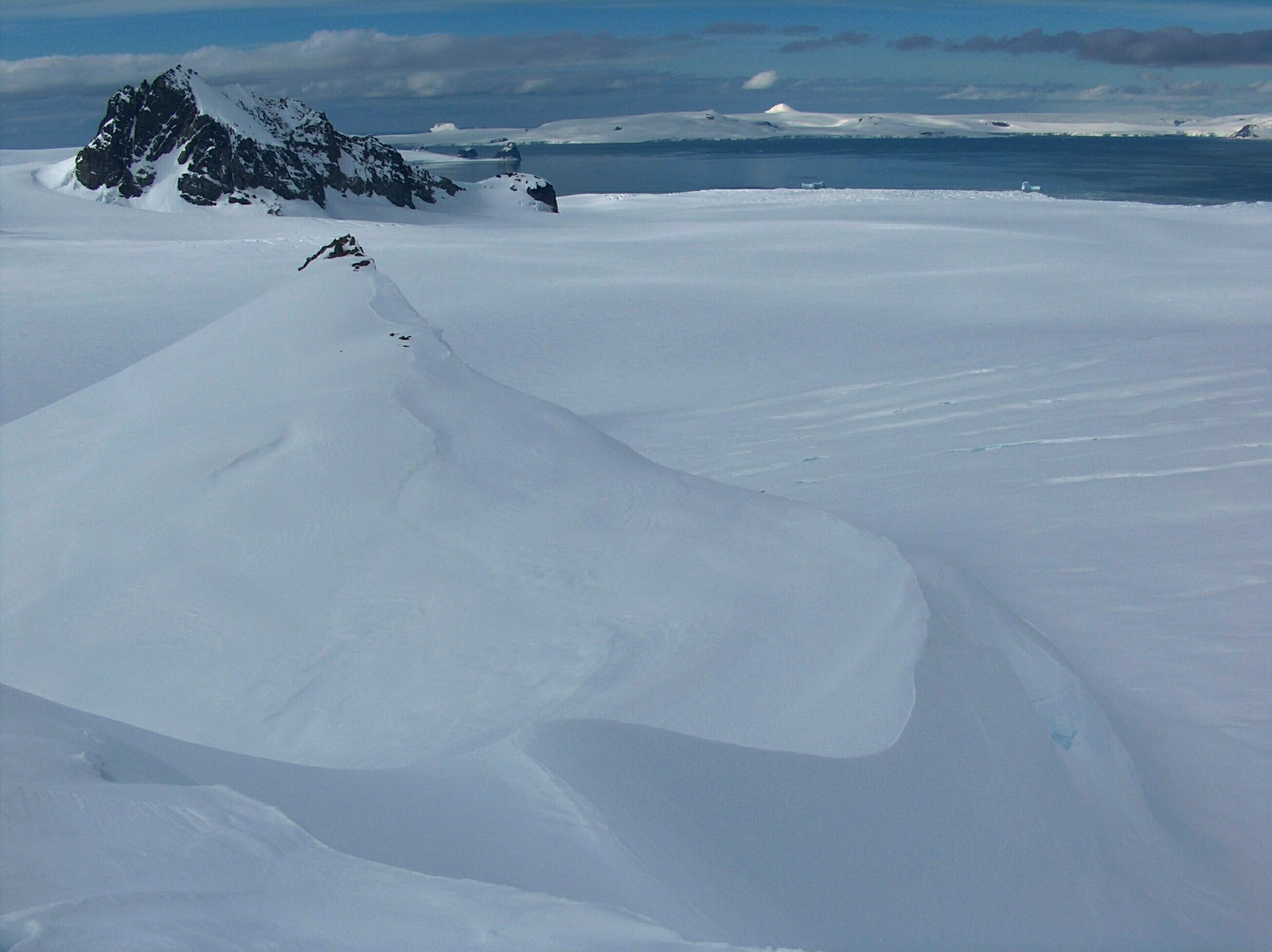

Highest point
- Elevation: 390 m (1,280 ft)
- Coordinates: 62°38′23.3″S 60°07′53.5″W

Naming
- Pronunciation: [axɛˈlɔjski ˈnunatak]

Geography
- Location: Antarctica

Location of Livingston Island in the South Shetland Islands.

Topographic map of Livingston Island, Greenwich, Robert, Snow and Smith Islands.

Aheloy Nunatak (Bulgarian: Ахелойски Нунатак, romanized: Aheloyski Nunatak, IPA: [ɐxɛˈɫɔjski ˈnunɐtɐk]) is a rocky 390m peak in the upper Huron Glacier in Livingston Island. The peak forms the northeast extremity of a minor ridge which also features Erma Knoll and Lozen Nunatak, and is linked to Zograf Peak by Lozen Saddle. The peak was first visited on 31 December 2004 by the Bulgarian Lyubomir Ivanov from Camp Academia, and was mapped in the Bulgarian Tangra 2004/05 topographic survey. The peak was named after the Black Sea town of Aheloy, Bulgaria.

== Location ==
The peak is located at 62°38′23.3″S 60°07′53.5″W which is 1.6 km east-southeast of Kuzman Knoll, 2.48 km south by east of Maritsa Peak, 1.6 km north-northeast of Zograf Peak and 270 m north-northeast of Erma Knoll.

== See also ==
- Tangra 2004/05
- Tangra Mountains
- Livingston Island
- List of Bulgarian toponyms in Antarctica
- Antarctic Place-names Commission

== Maps ==
- L.L. Ivanov et al. Antarctica: Livingston Island and Greenwich Island, South Shetland Islands. Scale 1:100000 topographic map. Sofia: Antarctic Place-names Commission of Bulgaria, 2005.
- L.L. Ivanov. Antarctica: Livingston Island and Greenwich, Robert, Snow and Smith Islands. Scale 1:120000 topographic map. Troyan: Manfred Wörner Foundation, 2009.
- A. Kamburov and L. Ivanov. Bowles Ridge and Central Tangra Mountains: Livingston Island, Antarctica. Scale 1:25000 map. Sofia: Manfred Wörner Foundation, 2023. ISBN 978-619-90008-6-1
