= Petrich Peak =

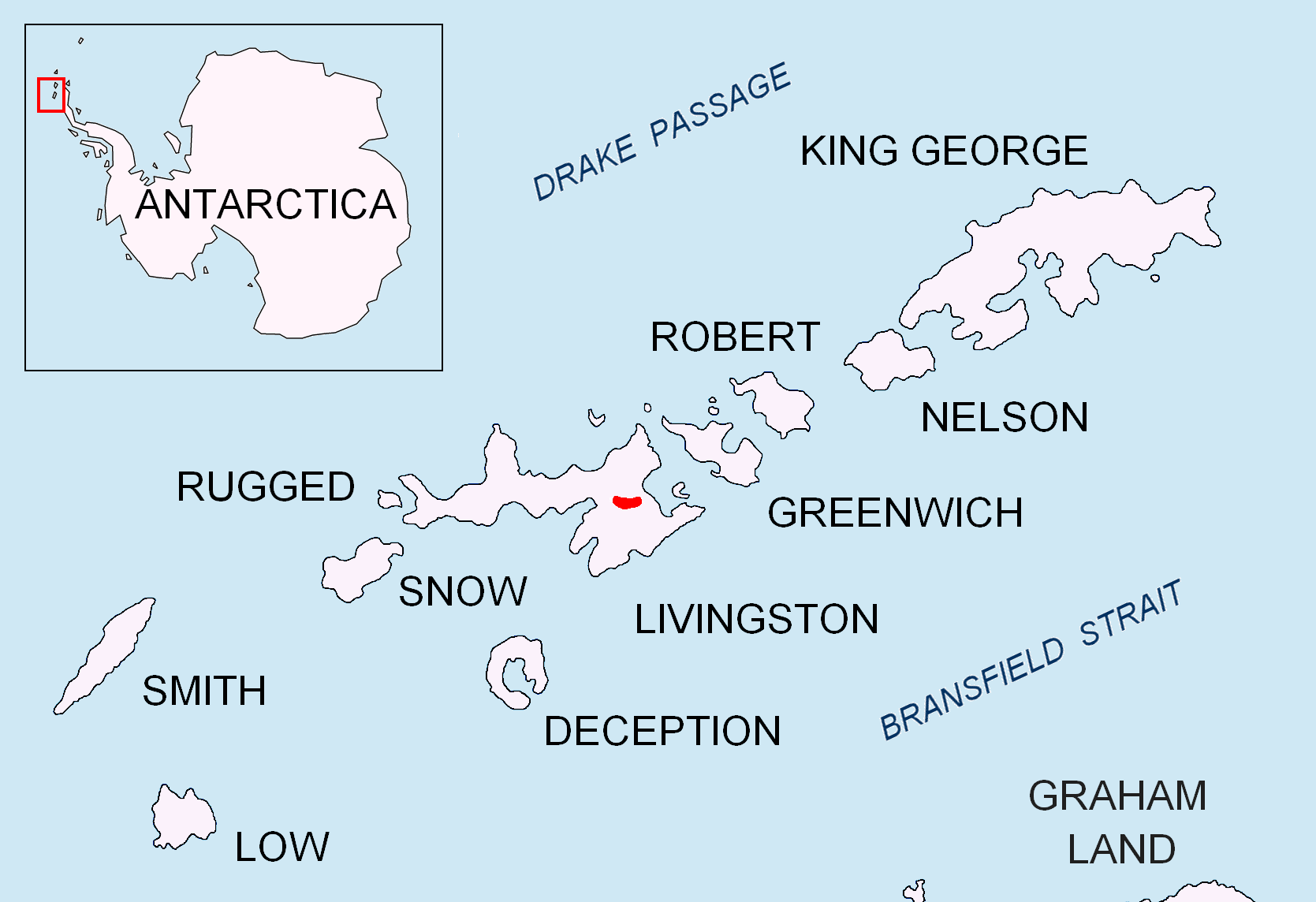
Location of Bowles Ridge on Livingston Island in the South Shetland Islands.

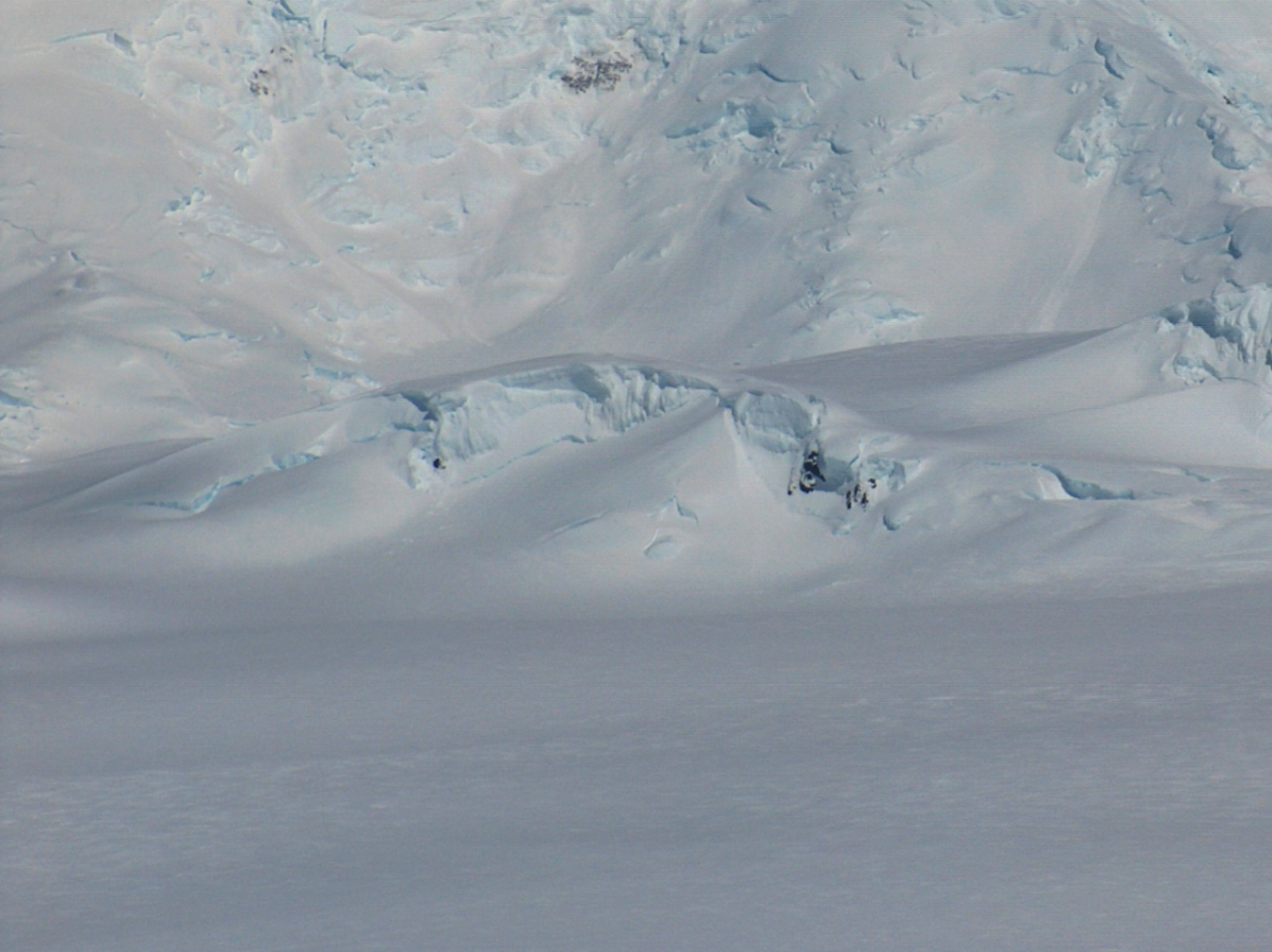
Petrich Peak from Zemen Knoll, with Tangra Mountains in the background.

Topographic map of Livingston Island, Greenwich, Robert, Snow and Smith Islands.

Petrich Peak (Bulgarian: връх Петрич, romanized: vrah Petrich, IPA: [ˈvrɤx ˈpɛtrit͡ʃ]) is an ice-covered peak of elevation 760 m in central Bowles Ridge on Livingston Island in the South Shetland Islands, Antarctica, which is named after the town of Petrich in Southwestern Bulgaria.

== Location ==
The peak is located at 62°36′56″S 60°10′39″Wm which is 400 m east of Ticha Peak, 1.98 km southwest of Melnik Peak, and 1.25 km west of the summit of Asparuh Peak (Bulgarian topographic survey Tangra 2004/05).

== Maps ==
- L.L. Ivanov et al. Antarctica: Livingston Island and Greenwich Island, South Shetland Islands. Scale 1:100000 topographic map. Sofia: Antarctic Place-names Commission of Bulgaria, 2005.
- L.L. Ivanov. Antarctica: Livingston Island and Greenwich, Robert, Snow and Smith Islands. Scale 1:120000 topographic map. Troyan: Manfred Wörner Foundation, 2009. ISBN 978-954-92032-6-4
- A. Kamburov and L. Ivanov. Bowles Ridge and Central Tangra Mountains: Livingston Island, Antarctica. Scale 1:25000 map. Sofia: Manfred Wörner Foundation, 2023. ISBN 978-619-90008-6-1
