= Rezen Saddle =

Geographical feature in the South Shetland Islands, Antarctica

Location of Livingston Island in the South Shetland Islands.

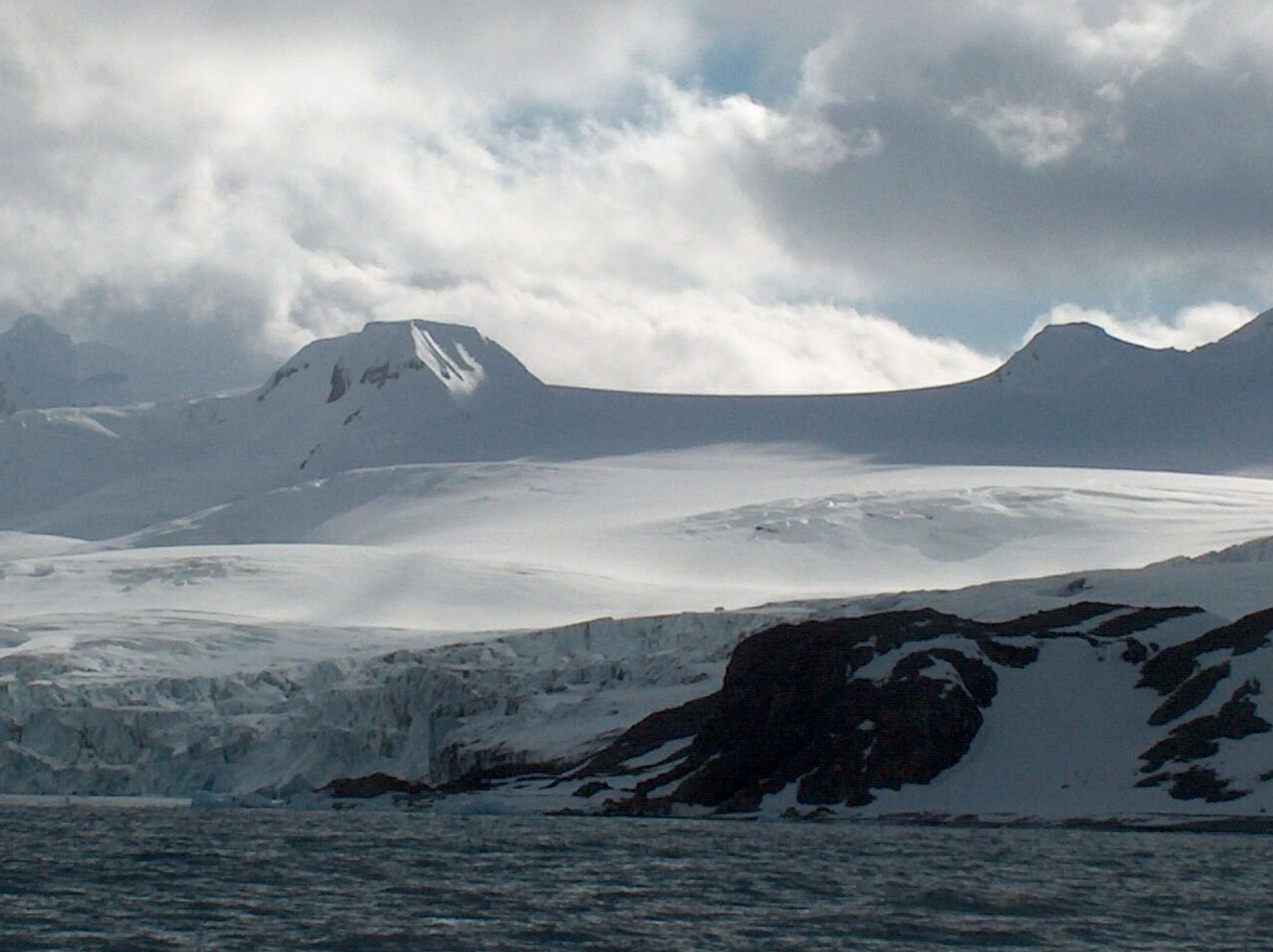
Rezen Saddle from Emona Anchorage, with Spanish Knoll in the foreground.

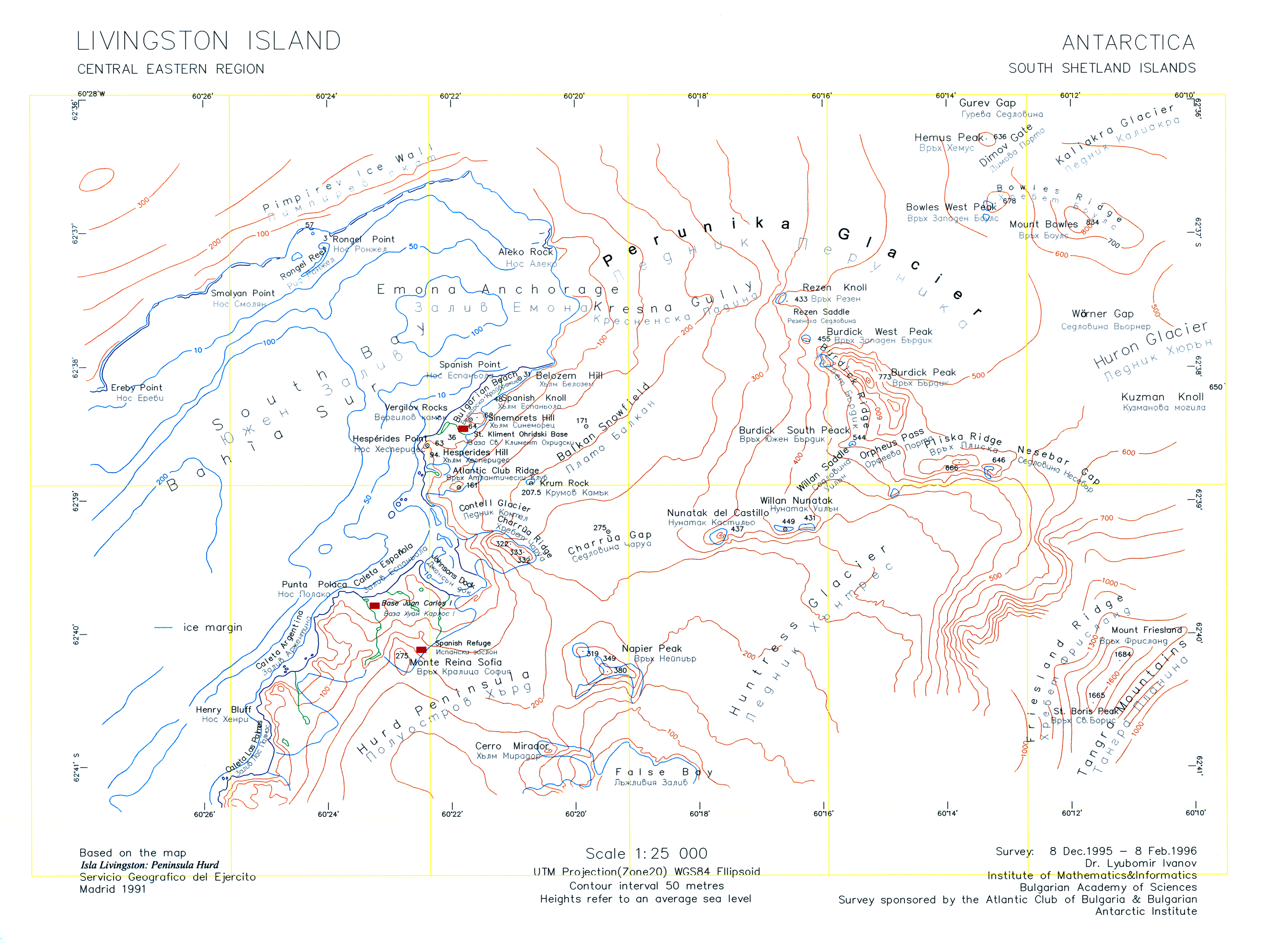
Topographic map of central-eastern Livingston Island featuring Rezen Saddle.

Topographic map of Livingston Island and Smith Island.

Rezen Saddle (Bulgarian: Rezenska Sedlovina \'re-zen-ska se-dlo-vi-'na\) is a geographical feature on Livingston Island in the South Shetland Islands, Antarctica. The 600 m long horseshoe-shaped flat saddle of elevation 420 m lies between Rezen Knoll and Burdick Ridge in eastern Livingston Island, affording overland access from Balkan Snowfield to upper Perunika Glacier and Bowles Ridge area.

First visited by the Bulgarians Kuzman Tuhchiev, Dimo Dimov and Ivan Tashukov from St. Kliment Ohridski Base during the 1994/95 season.

The feature takes its name from the adjacent Rezen Knoll.

== Location ==
The saddle is centred at 62°37′35″S 60°15′57″W, which is 5.15 km east-northeast of Sinemorets Hill by the Bulgarian base, 3.4 km southwest of Dimov Gate, 3.97 km west of Omurtag Pass, 7.38 km west of Pirdop Gate and 2.23 km northwest of Orpheus Gate (Detailed mapping by the Spanish Servicio Geogràfico del Ejército in 1991, Bulgarian mapping in 1996, 2005 and 2009).

== Maps ==
- Isla Livingston: Península Hurd. Mapa topográfico de escala 1:25000. Madrid: Servicio Geográfico del Ejército, 1991. (Map reproduced on p. 16 of the linked work)
- L.L. Ivanov. Livingston Island: Central-Eastern Region. Scale 1:25000 topographic map. Sofia: Antarctic Place-names Commission of Bulgaria, 1996.
- L.L. Ivanov et al. Antarctica: Livingston Island and Greenwich Island, South Shetland Islands. Scale 1:100000 topographic map. Sofia: Antarctic Place-names Commission of Bulgaria, 2005.
- L.L. Ivanov. Antarctica: Livingston Island and Greenwich, Robert, Snow and Smith Islands. Scale 1:120000 topographic map. Troyan: Manfred Wörner Foundation, 2009. ISBN 978-954-92032-6-4
- Antarctic Digital Database (ADD). Scale 1:250000 topographic map of Antarctica. Scientific Committee on Antarctic Research (SCAR). Since 1993, regularly upgraded and updated.
- L.L. Ivanov. Antarctica: Livingston Island and Smith Island. Scale 1:100000 topographic map. Manfred Wörner Foundation, 2017. ISBN 978-619-90008-3-0
- A. Kamburov and L. Ivanov. Bowles Ridge and Central Tangra Mountains: Livingston Island, Antarctica. Scale 1:25000 map. Sofia: Manfred Wörner Foundation, 2023. ISBN 978-619-90008-6-1
