= Omurtag Pass =

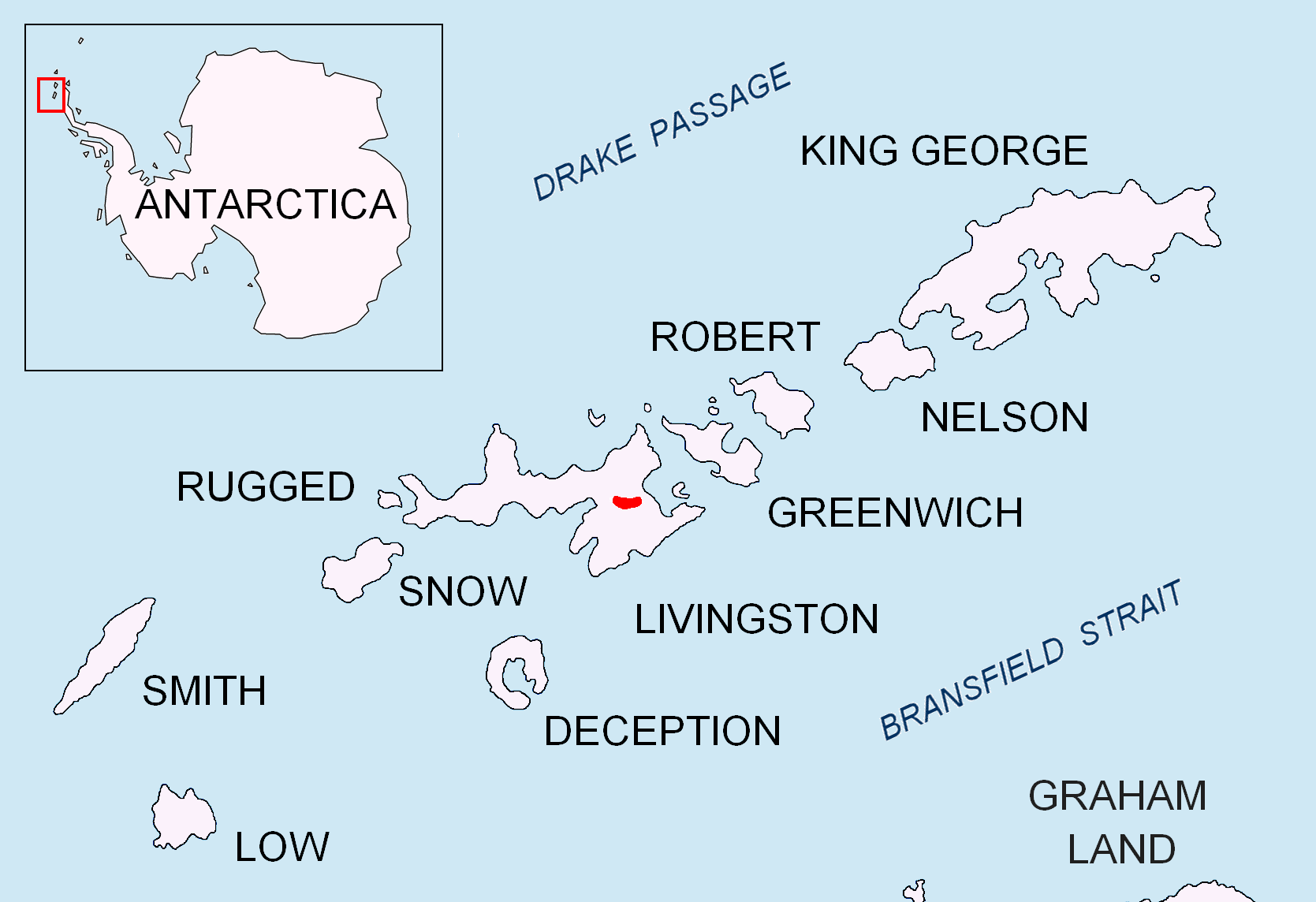
Location of Bowles Ridge on Livingston Island in the South Shetland Islands.

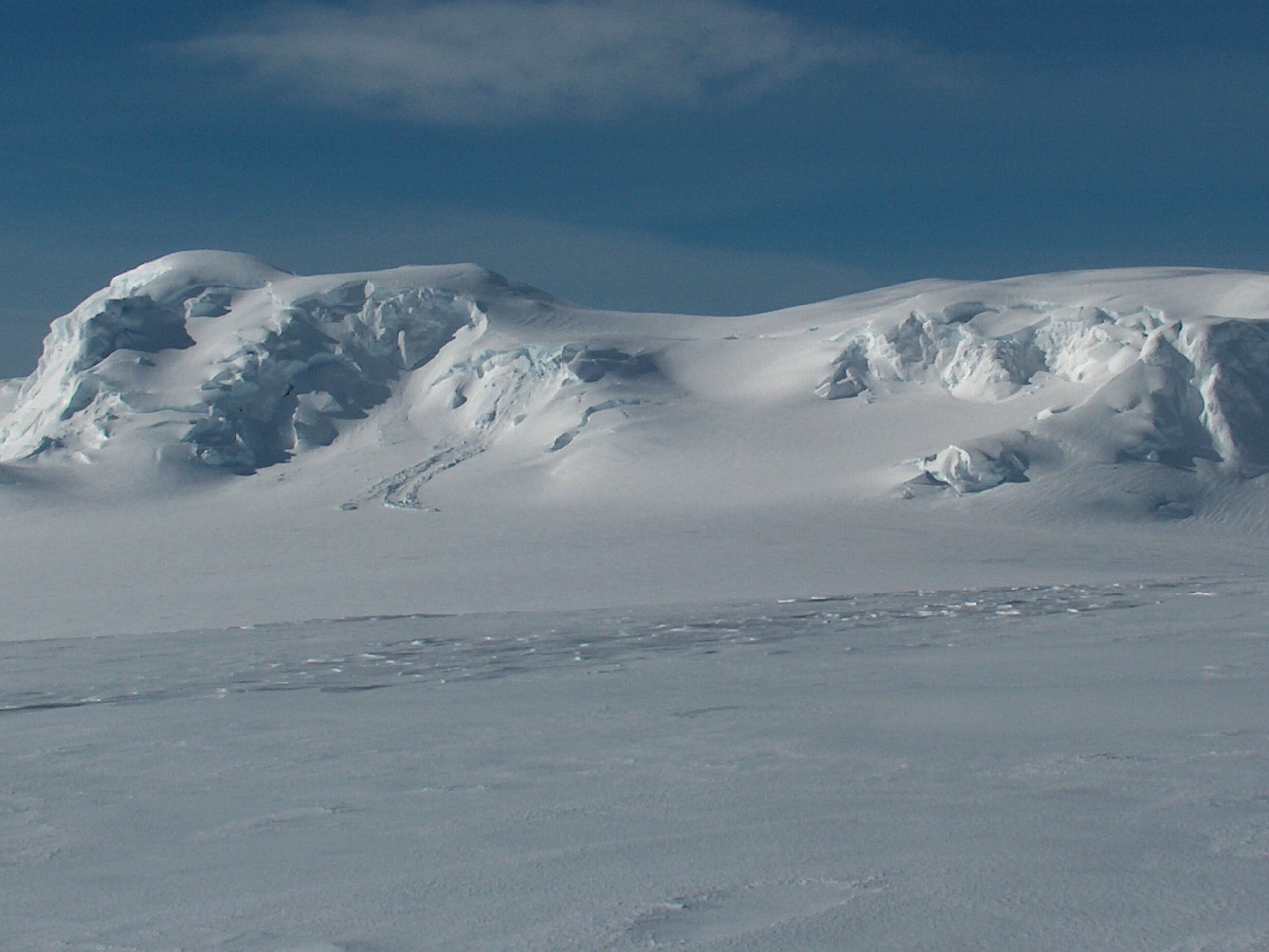
Omurtag Pass from Camp Academia area, with Mount Bowles on the left and Wörner Gap in the foreground.

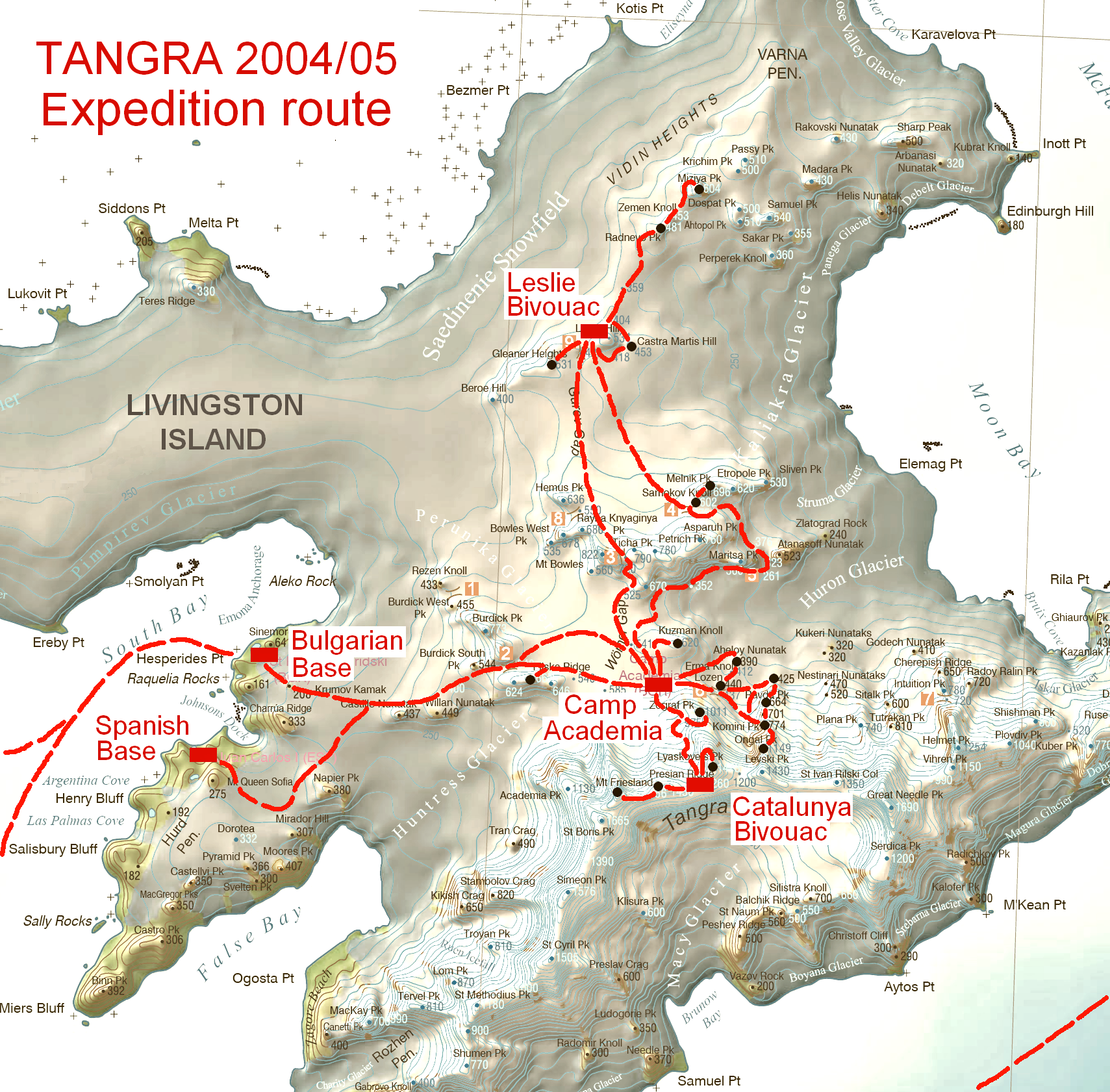
The survey route of Tangra 2004/05 including Omurtag Pass.

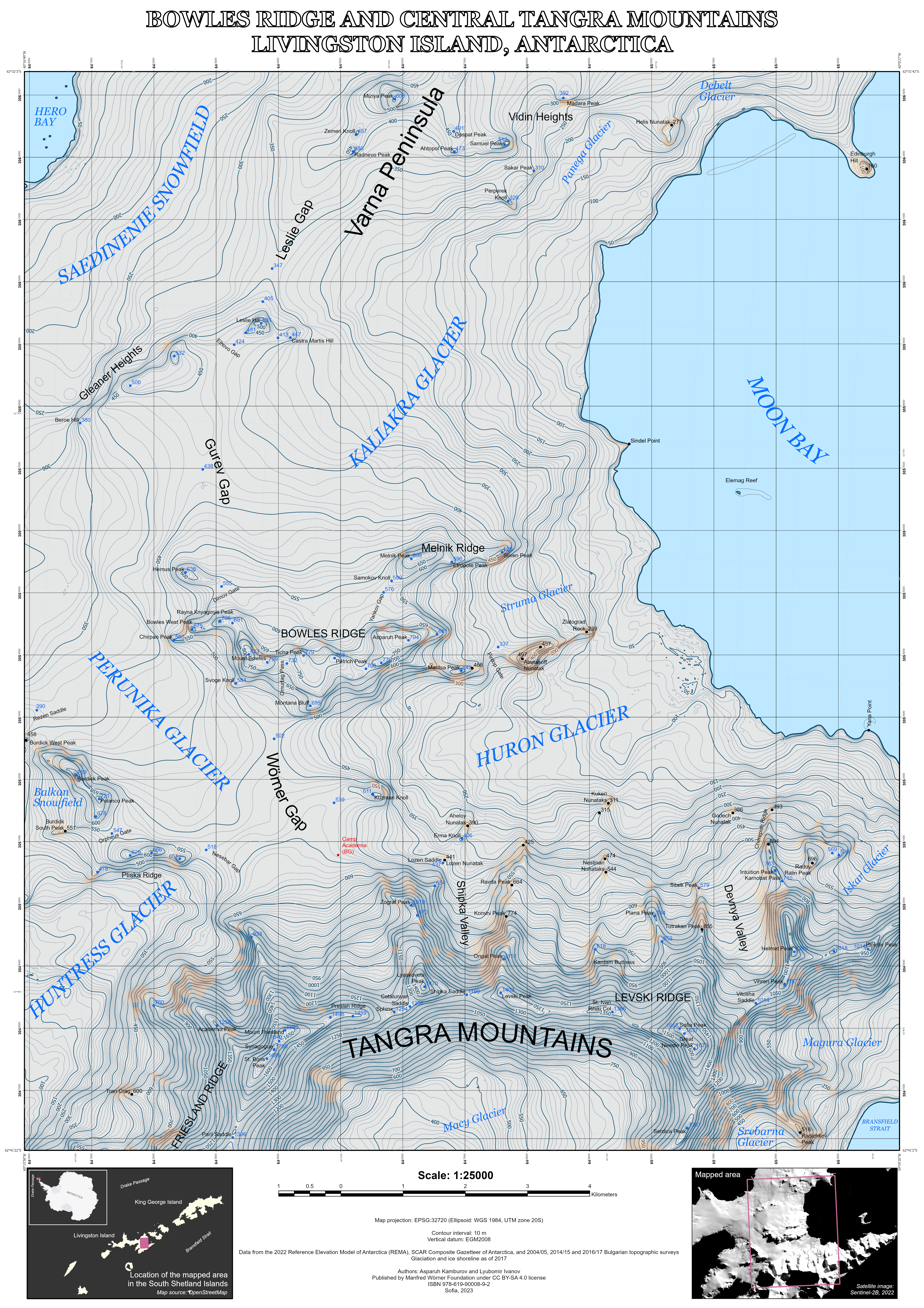
Topographic map of Bowles Ridge and central Tangra Mountains featuring Omurtag Pass

Omurtag Pass (Omurtagov Prohod \o-mur-'ta-gov 'pro-hod\) is a 720 m high pass between Mount Bowles and Ticha Peak in Bowles Ridge, Livingston Island in the South Shetland Islands, Antarctica and is part of an overland route between the Wörner Gap area and upper Kaliakra Glacier. The pass is named after Khan Omurtag of Bulgaria, 814-831 AD.

First crossed by Lyubomir Ivanov and Doychin Vasilev from Camp Academia on 24 December 2004.

== Location ==
The pass is located at 62°37′03″S 60°11′27″W which is 3.87 km northeast of Orpheus Gate, 3.97 km east of Rezen Saddle, 5.16 km south of Elhovo Gap, 3.25 km west of Pirdop Gate, 4.09 km northwest of Lozen Saddle and 5.86 km northwest of Catalunyan Saddle (Bulgarian topographic survey Tangra 2004/05, and mapping in 2005 and 2009).

== Maps ==
- L.L. Ivanov et al. Antarctica: Livingston Island and Greenwich Island, South Shetland Islands. Scale 1:100000 topographic map. Sofia: Antarctic Place-names Commission of Bulgaria, 2005.
- Antarctic Digital Database (ADD). Scale 1:250000 topographic map of Antarctica. Scientific Committee on Antarctic Research (SCAR). Since 1993, regularly upgraded and updated.
- L.L. Ivanov. Antarctica: Livingston Island and Smith Island. Scale 1:100000 topographic map. Manfred Wörner Foundation, 2017. ISBN 978-619-90008-3-0
- A. Kamburov and L. Ivanov. Bowles Ridge and Central Tangra Mountains: Livingston Island, Antarctica. Scale 1:25000 map. Sofia: Manfred Wörner Foundation, 2023. ISBN 978-619-90008-6-1
