= Àlex Simón i Casanovas =

Spanish mountain guide (born 1960)

Àlex S.Casanovas
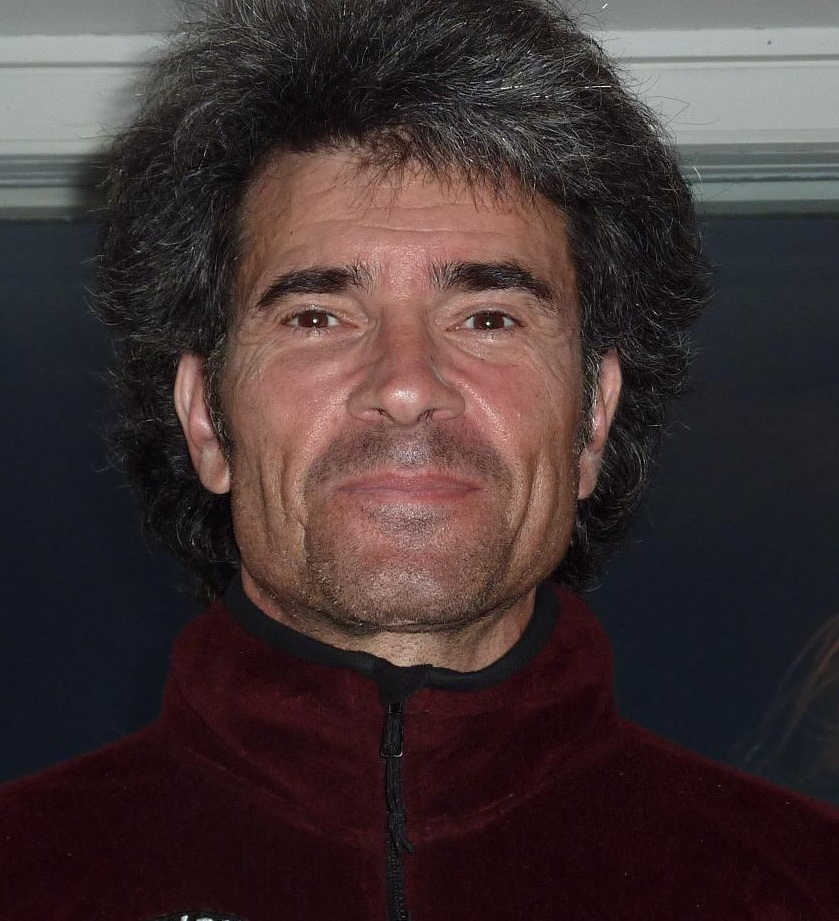
- Born: 8 November 1960 (age 65); Barcelona, Catalonia
- Occupation: Polar Guide, climbing teacher, sport events organizer
- Website: www.polarguide-logistics.com

Àlex S.Casanovas, born on November 8, 1960 in Barcelona's Gràcia district, is an experienced Catalonian mountain guide, rock-climbing teacher, polar logistics expert and adventurer. His career spans mountaineering, polar expeditions, and organizing extreme sports event.

Àlex is characterized in public life by an independent and reflective disposition. He is noted for a direct communication style, often utilizing satire or humor in his discourse. He is a prominent advocate for Catalan nationalism, frequently engaging in public debate regarding the region's political status.

His interests extend to geopolitics, culture, and the history of exploration and Catalonia.

He has worked in both the Arctic and Antartica for years, and is known for promoting both participation and safety in endurance sports done in extreme environments.

His extensive experience and dedication have made him a recognized figure in Europe in the field of polar and extreme adventure sports.

== Early years and introduction to mountaineering ==
As a child, Àlex was a Boy-Scout and also took part in artistic gymnastics and water sports, including Optimist-class sailing, water skiing, and offshore yacht racing as co-pilot.

He discovered mountaineering at the age of fifteen, in 1976, beginning a lifelong passion for climbing and the mountains.

== Professional trajectory ==
To fund his mountaineering, Simón worked a variety of seasonal and manual jobs over several decades, including agricultural labour, carpentry, cooking, bicycle mechanics, painting, scaffolding, and rope access.

In 1984 he obtained a maritime seaman’s certification, but his true goal was always to become a mountain guide and a climbing teacher.

That dream became a reality in 1988, when he began teaching rock climbing at the Catalan School of High Mountain (ECAM).

He worked as a mountain guide and organized climbing courses for educational institutions across Europe.

Open to new experiences, he worked in 1993–1994 as a logistics officer for Doctors Without Borders in Guatemala, where he developed his own logistics approach. However, disillusioned by the business-like nature of the humanitarian sector, he left and returned to the mountain world, and also guided rafting and canyoning in Pallars Sobirà (Catalonia).

In 2001, he began working in Antarctica and would go on to complete eight seasons there.

Later, in 2010, he founded Polarguide and Logistics in Finland—a company focused on polar expeditions and organizing endurance sports events in Arctic regions.

== Experience in Antarctica ==
From 2000 to 2007, Àlex led the mountain guide team at Spanish Antarctic Station Juan Carlos I on Livingston Island, in the South Shetland Islands. There, he provided extensive field logistics support for glaciological and scientific research on the Hurd Peninsula, Huron Glacier,Ioannes Paulus II Peninsula, and the island’s hydrographic divide.

During the 2001–2002 and 2002–2003 seasons, he was head of logistics, maintenance, and safety for the first Limnopolar project on Byers Peninsula, overseeing pre-expedition planning, camp installation, and support for multiple scientific teams.

His work was vital in enabling research in these extreme environments. He also contributed to the mapping of little-explored areas, such as the Oryahovo Heights.

From 2009 to 2011, he worked aboard a polar expedition cruise ship as logistics coordinator, Zodiac pilot, and lecturer.

== Notable climbs and honors in Antarctica ==
On January 5, 2003, Àlex made the first recorded ascent of Mount Bowles (839 m [2,753 ft]), Livingston Island. Later that year, on November 20, he climbed Burdick East Peak (735 m), also a first ascent.

In recognition of his contributions to Antarctic exploration, Casanovas Peak (325 m) on Livingston Island in the South Shetland Islands, Antarctica was named after him

== Motorsport ==
Àlex had a brief but notable foray into motorsports. He raced go-karts and managed a semi-professional team. In 2006, his team “Seven7” competed in the 24 Hours of Barcelona – Fermí Vélez Trophy, finishing second in its category and sixth overall.

== Iditarod Trail Invitational (ITI) ==
In 2011, Àlex took part in the Iditarod Trail Invitational, a grueling winter race in Alaska along the legendary Iditarod trail. Riding a fatbike (with wide tires for snow), he covered 350 miles (~560 km) from Knik Lake to McGrath in remote Alaska, finishing 25th out of 45 participants.

The race is entirely self-supported, with sub –40°C temperatures. Competitors must carry all their gear, making it one of the toughest endurance challenges in the world.

Àlex’s participation was a landmark achievement, especially for a European—and the first and only Catalan to date 2025— to complete the race.

Inspired by this experience, he later created the Arctic Circle Winter Races.

== Extreme sports event organisation ==
Inspired by the Iditarod Trail Invitational, from 2012 to 2022, Àlex created the Arctic Circle Winter Races in Finnish Lapland (Rovaniemi150 -150 km/93 mi). Was the first European winter ultramarathon combining fatbike, skiing, and foot races, and also introducing for first time in Europe the fatbike race.

In 2015, the event expanded with 66 km (41 mi) and 300 km (190 mi) categories, attracting international athletes.

In 2014 he also created the Lapland Extreme Challenge, a 1,000 km (620 mi) solo route through Arctic Lapland in winter—one of the toughest tests of endurance in polar conditions. To date 2025, only three athletes have successfully completed it.

== Publications and contributions to safety in extreme environments ==
Over the years, Àlex has written many articles, though not all have been published.

In 2008, he authored The Snowmobile Bible: Progressive Safety Over Dangerous Terrain, a comprehensive technical guide for professionals on snowmobile operations over hazardous terrain such as glaciers. The book emphasizes risk management and safety planning.

From 2014 to 2025, he was also the editor of El Blog de Finlandia, a commercial travel blog aimed at Spanish-speaking audiences, offering information on Finland and helping travelers plan trips. The blog is now closed.

- Article "Bajo el sol del desierto". Solo Bici nº7. Dec. 1991.
- Article "La motoneige et moi-une expérience en Antarctique". Motoneige Quebec. Dec 2009.
- Article "Sueños gélidos, sacos para frio extremo". Desnivel. Dec 2002.
- Àlex S. Casanovas. [The Snowmobile Bible: Progressive safety over dangerous terrain]. Lulu Inc., 2008. 112 pp. ISBN 978-1-4092-2363-4

== Current projects and life in Finland ==
Since 2007, Àlex has lived in Finnish Lapland. His company, Polarguide and Logistics, remains active today—but at a smaller scale—offering services to small, specialized groups.
