= Wörner Gap =

Flat saddle in Friesland Ridge and Bowles Ridge

Location of Livingston Island in the South Shetland Islands.

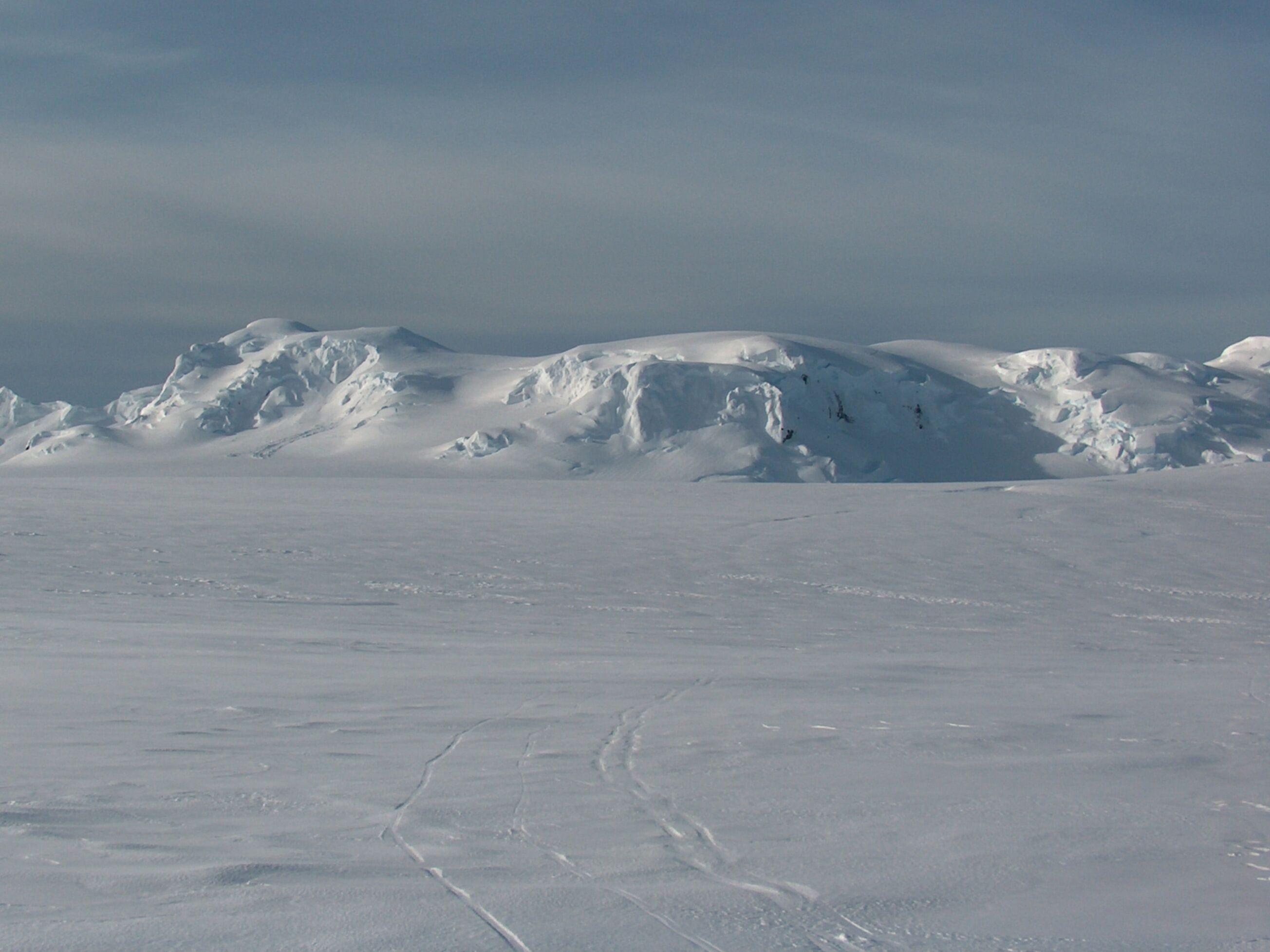
Wörner Gap from Camp Academia area, with Bowles Ridge in the background.

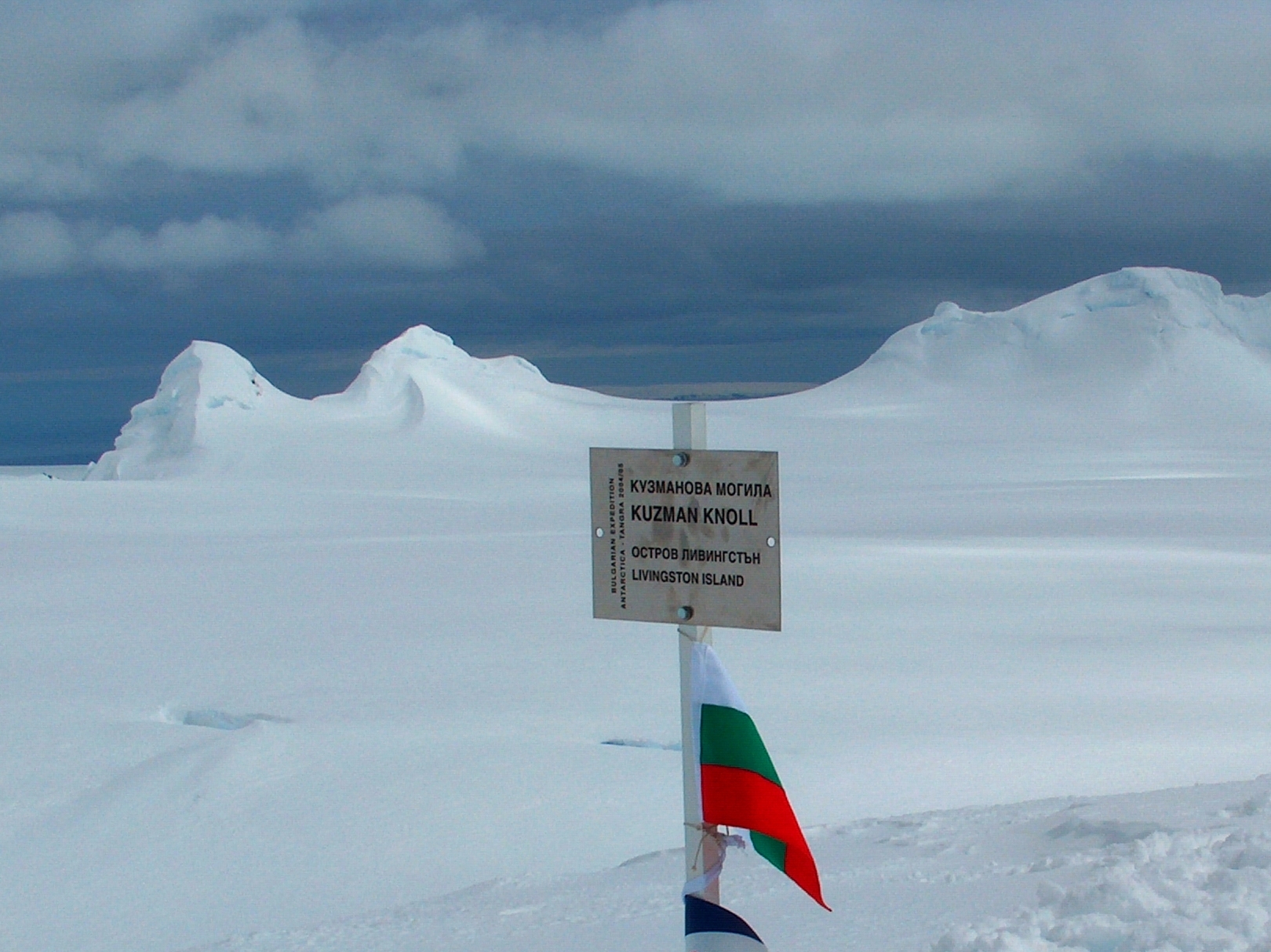
Wörner Gap from Kuzman Knoll, with Pliska Ridge and Burdick Ridge in the background.

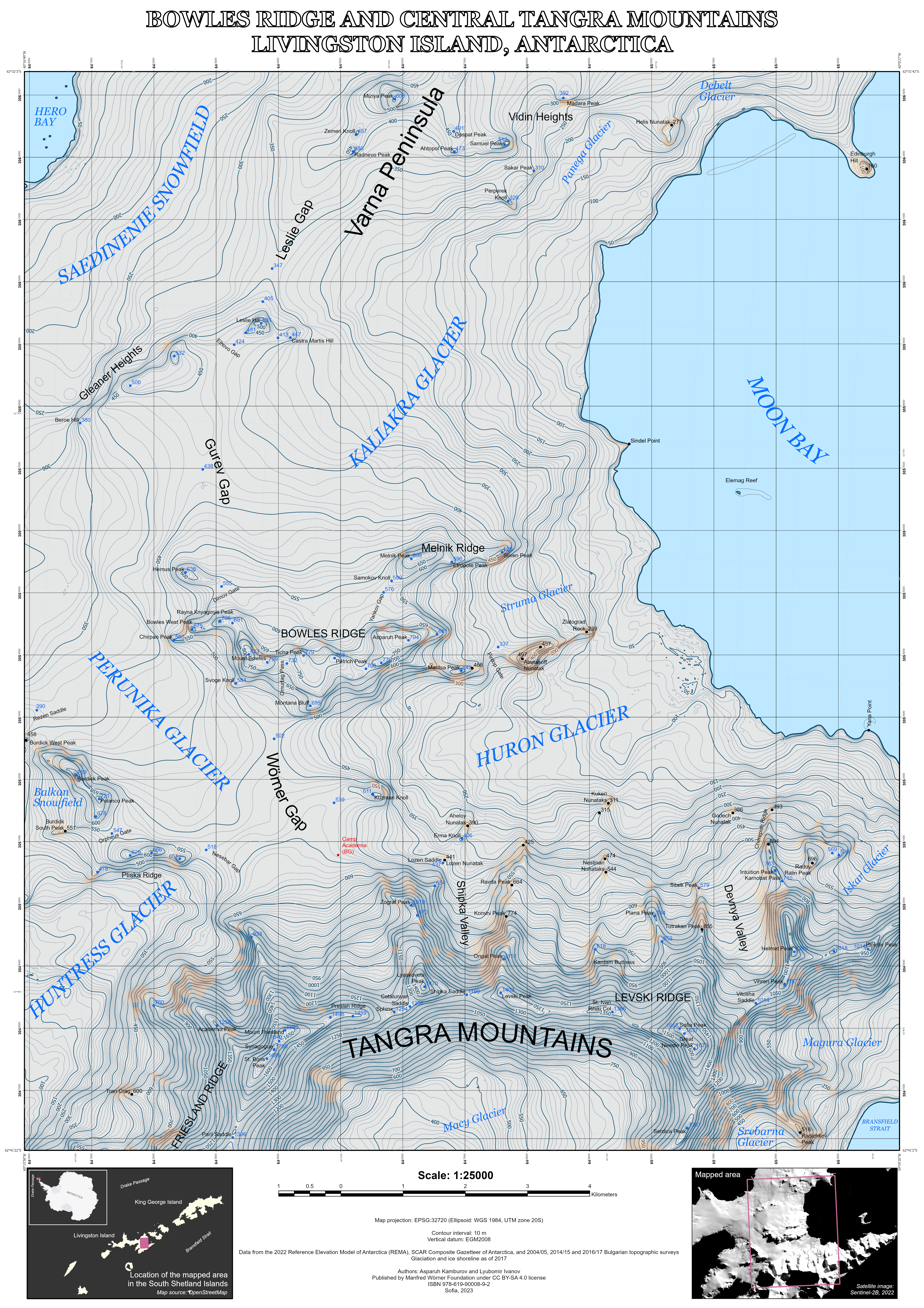
Topographic map of Bowles Ridge and Central Tangra Mountains

Wörner Gap (Sedlovina Wörner \se-dlo-vi-'na 'vyor-ner\) is a flat saddle extending 3 km in the south-north direction between Friesland Ridge and Bowles Ridge in eastern Livingston Island in the South Shetland Islands, Antarctica. Its elevation decreases from 585 m in the south to 541 m in the middle, and 525 m in the north. The gap separates the glacial catchments of Perunika Glacier to the west and Huron Glacier to the east, and is linked to the east to Kuzman Knoll, a conspicuous landmark in the area. The gap is visited by field parties from St. Kliment Ohridski Base and Juan Carlos I Base and is subject to Spanish and Bulgarian glaciological studies.

The feature is named after the late Secretary General of the Atlantic Alliance Dr. Manfred Wörner (1934–94) in recognition of his contribution to European unity.

== Location ==
The gap's midpoint is located at 62°38′13.5″S 60°10′57″W, which is 1.07 km west of Kuzman Knoll, 2.39 km northwest of Zograf Peak, 3.76 km north of Mount Friesland, 2.64 km east-northeast of Pliska Peak, 3.79 km east of Burdick Peak, 2.49 km south-southeast of Mount Bowles and 1.53 km south of Montana Bluff. British mapping in 1968 and Spanish in 1991, Bulgarian topographic surveys in 1995/96 and 2004/05, and mapping in 1996, 2005 and 2009.

== See also ==
- Camp Academia
- Tangra 2004/05
- Livingston Island

== Maps ==
Topographic map of Livingston Island and Smith Island

- South Shetland Islands. Scale 1:200000 topographic map. DOS 610 Sheet W 62 60. Tolworth, UK, 1968.
- Isla Livingston: Península Hurd. Mapa topográfico de escala 1:25 000. Madrid: Servicio Geográfico del Ejército, 1991.
- L.L. Ivanov. Livingston Island: Central-Eastern Region. Scale 1:25000 topographic map. Sofia: Antarctic Place-names Commission of Bulgaria, 1996.
- L.L. Ivanov et al. Antarctica: Livingston Island and Greenwich Island, South Shetland Islands. Scale 1:100000 topographic map. Sofia: Antarctic Place-names Commission of Bulgaria, 2005.
- L.L. Ivanov. Antarctica: Livingston Island and Greenwich, Robert, Snow and Smith Islands. Scale 1:120000 topographic map. Troyan: Manfred Wörner Foundation, 2010. ISBN 978-954-92032-9-5 (First edition 2009. ISBN 978-954-92032-6-4)
- Antarctic Digital Database (ADD). Scale 1:250000 topographic map of Antarctica. Scientific Committee on Antarctic Research (SCAR). Since 1993, regularly updated.
- L.L. Ivanov. Antarctica: Livingston Island and Smith Island. Scale 1:100000 topographic map. Manfred Wörner Foundation, 2017. ISBN 978-619-90008-3-0
- A. Kamburov and L. Ivanov. Bowles Ridge and Central Tangra Mountains: Livingston Island, Antarctica. Scale 1:25000 map. Sofia: Manfred Wörner Foundation, 2023. ISBN 978-619-90008-6-1

== Bibliography ==
- J. Stewart. Antarctica: An Encyclopedia. Jefferson, N.C. and London: McFarland, 2011. 1771 pp. ISBN 978-0-7864-3590-6
