= Erma Knoll =

Peak in Antarctica

Location of Livingston Island in the South Shetland Islands

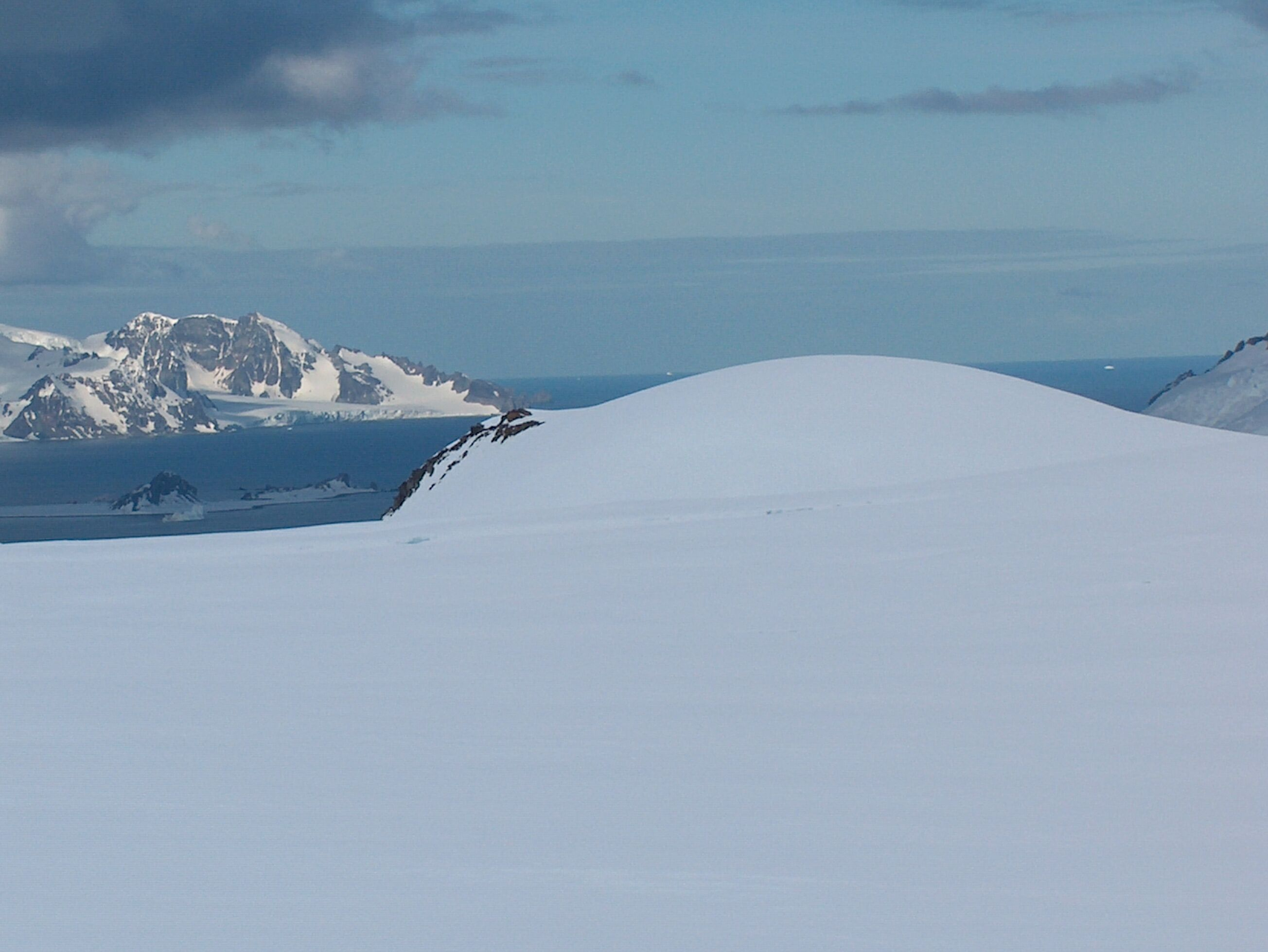
Erma Knoll from near Camp Academia, with McFarlane Strait and Greenwich Island in the background

Topographic map of Livingston Island and Smith Island

Erma Knoll (Bulgarian: Ерменска могила, romanized: Ermenska mogila, IPA: [ˈɛrmɛnskɐ moˈɡiɫɐ]) is a 412 m (1,352 ft) peak in upper Huron Glacier, Livingston Island. The peak was first visited on 17 December 2004 by the Bulgarian Lyubomir Ivanov from Camp Academia, and was mapped by Bulgaria in 2005 and 2009 from the Tangra 2004/05 topographic survey. The knoll is named after Erma River in western Bulgaria.

== Location ==
The knoll is located at 62°38′31″S 60°08′01″W which is 1.6 km east-southeast of Kuzman Knoll, 1.3 km northeast of Zograf Peak and 390 m northeast of Lozen Nunatak.

== Maps ==
- L.L. Ivanov et al. Antarctica: Livingston Island and Greenwich Island, South Shetland Islands. Scale 1:100000 topographic map. Sofia: Antarctic Place-names Commission of Bulgaria, 2005.
- L.L. Ivanov. Antarctica: Livingston Island and Greenwich, Robert, Snow and Smith Islands. Scale 1:120000 topographic map. Troyan: Manfred Wörner Foundation, 2009.
- A. Kamburov and L. Ivanov. Bowles Ridge and Central Tangra Mountains: Livingston Island, Antarctica. Scale 1:25000 map. Sofia: Manfred Wörner Foundation, 2023. ISBN 978-619-90008-6-1
