= Mount Bowles =

Mountain in Antarctica

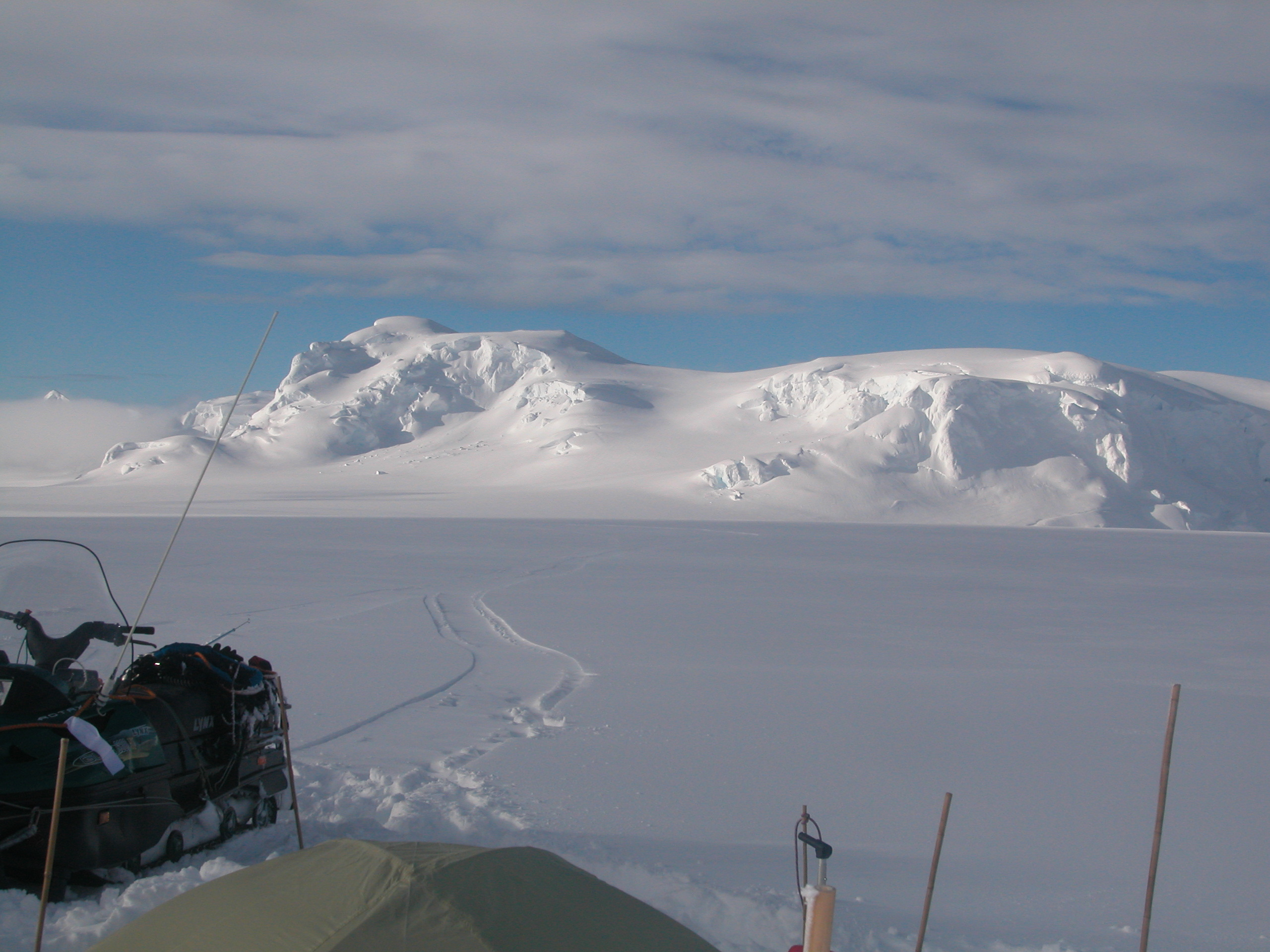
- Central Bowles Ridge from Wörner Gap, with Mount Bowles on the left and Omurtag Pass in the middle.

Highest point
- Peak: 822 metres (2,697 ft)
- Coordinates: 62°37′0.15″S 60°12′08.5″W

Geography
- Location within Antarctica
- Continent: Antarctica
- Island: Livingston Island, South Shetland Islands
- Parent range: Bowles Ridge

Climbing
- First ascent: Àlex Simón, Vicente Castro, David Hita, and friend (2003)

Mount Bowles is an ice-covered mountain 822 metres (2,697 ft) high, the summit of Bowles Ridge in the central part of eastern Livingston Island in the South Shetland Islands, Antarctica. It is situated south of Vidin Heights and north of Mount Friesland, Tangra Mountains to which it is linked by Wörner Gap.

The origin of the name is uncertain; it appears (poorly positioned and probably intended for some other peak on the island) on the 1829 chart of the British expedition (1828–31) under Captain Henry Foster in HMS Chanticleer.

Mount Bowles was first climbed by Àlex Simón, Vicente Castro, David Hita and a friend from Juan Carlos I base on January 5, 2003.

== Location ==
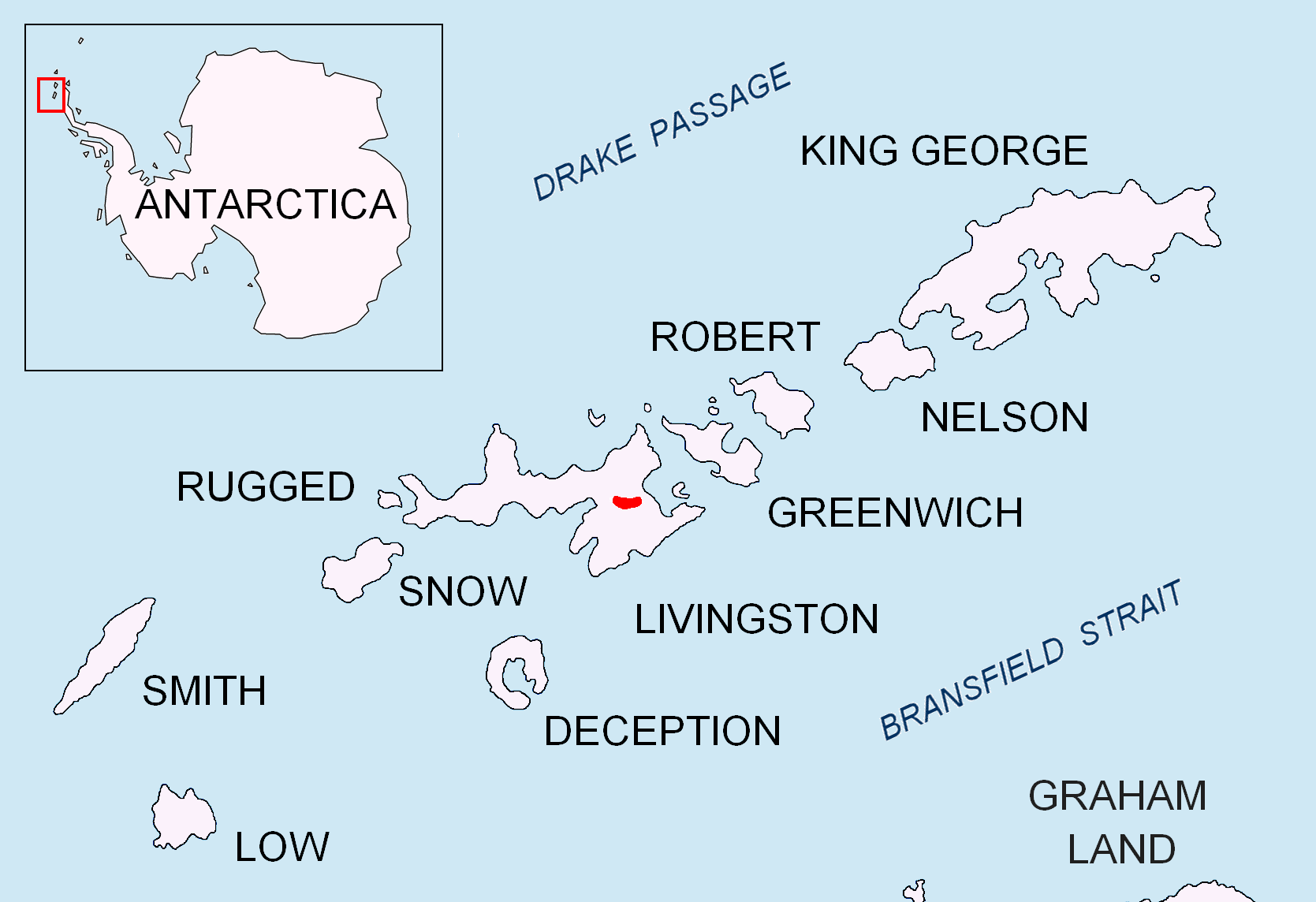
Location of Bowles Ridge on Livingston Island in the South Shetland Islands.

According to a 2003 Australian GPS survey the peak is located at 62°37′0.15″S 60°12′08.5″W, which is 9.77 km (6.07 mi) northwest of Great Needle Peak, 6.08 km (3.78 mi) north by west of Mount Friesland, 8.77 km (5.45 mi) east-northeast of St. Kliment Ohridski base and 9.25 km (5.75 mi) south by west of Miziya Peak.

== Maps ==
- S. Soccol, D. Gildea and J. Bath. Livingston Island, Antarctica. Scale 1:100000 satellite map. The Omega Foundation, USA, 2004.
- L.L. Ivanov et al., Antarctica: Livingston Island and Greenwich Island, South Shetland Islands (from English Strait to Morton Strait, with illustrations and ice-cover distribution), 1:100000 scale topographic map, Antarctic Place-names Commission of Bulgaria, Sofia, 2005
- L.L. Ivanov. Antarctica: Livingston Island and Greenwich, Robert, Snow and Smith Islands. Scale 1:120000 topographic map. Troyan: Manfred Wörner Foundation, 2009. ISBN 978-954-92032-6-4
- A. Kamburov and L. Ivanov. Bowles Ridge and Central Tangra Mountains: Livingston Island, Antarctica. Scale 1:25000 map. Sofia: Manfred Wörner Foundation, 2023. ISBN 978-619-90008-6-1
