= Kuzman Knoll =

Location of Livingston Island in the South Shetland Islands

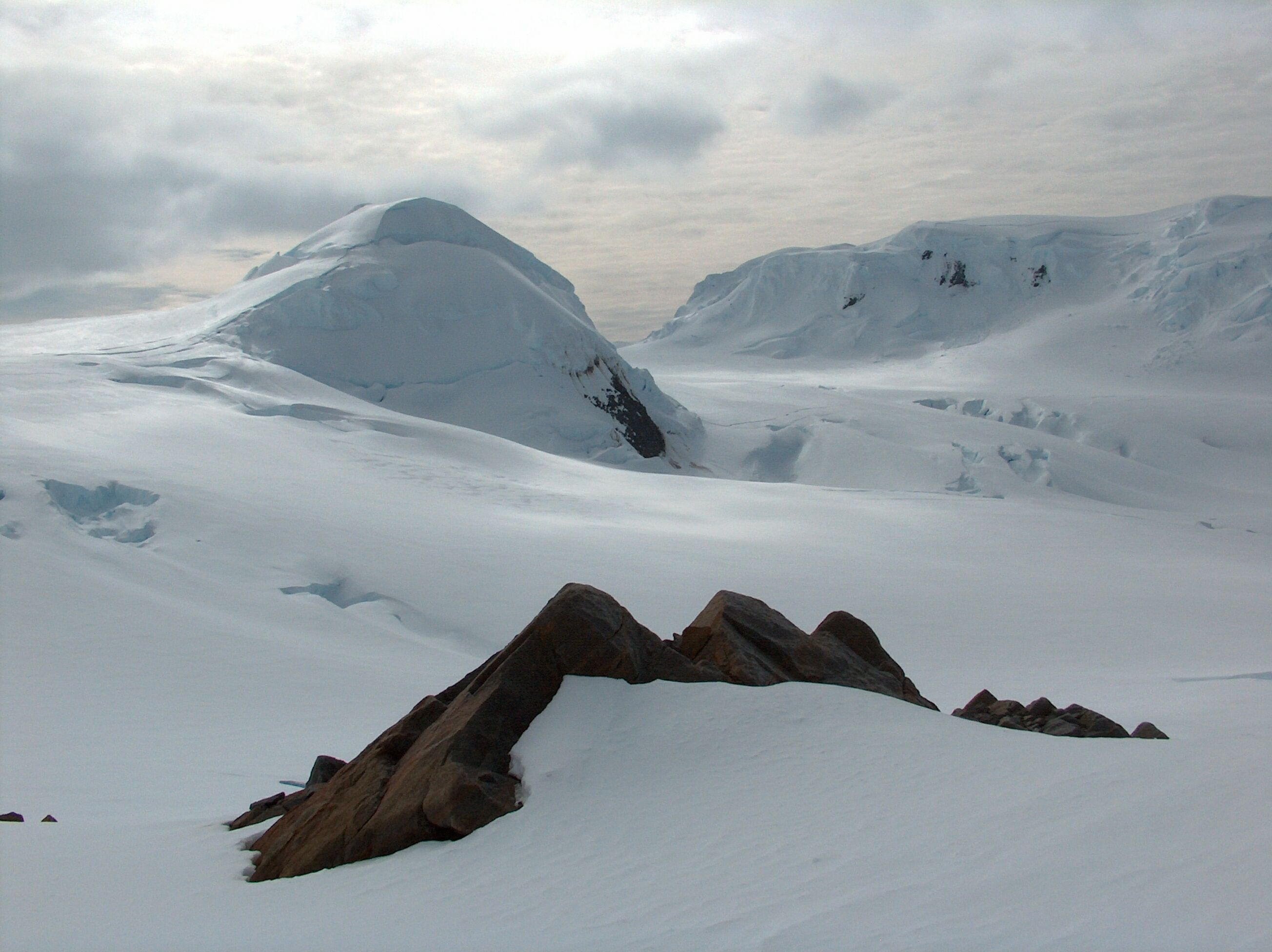
Kuzman Knoll from the north foothills of Ravda Peak

Topographic map of Livingston Island and Smith Island

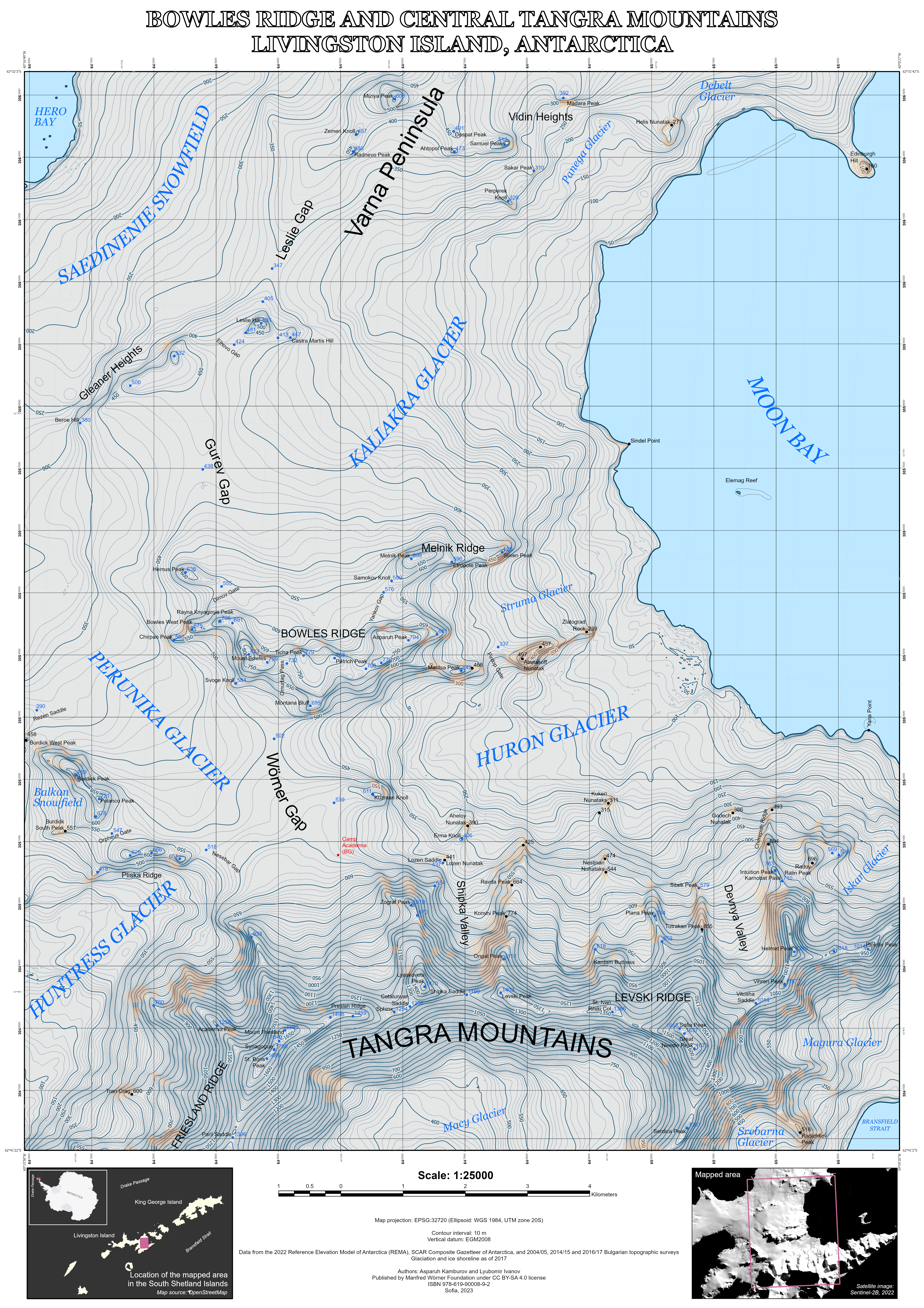
Topographic map of Bowles Ridge and Central Tangra Mountains featuring Kuzman Knoll

Kuzman Knoll (Kuzmanova Mogila \'kuz-ma-no-va mo-'gi-la\) is a solitary ice-covered knoll rising to 620 m in eastern Livingston Island in the South Shetland Islands, Antarctica. The knoll forms a conspicuous landmark in Wörner Gap area, overlooking Huron Glacier and upper Perunika Glacier. It was named after Kuzman Tuhchiev, participant in the 1993/94 Bulgarian Antarctic campaign and base commander at St. Kliment Ohridski during the 1994-96 seasons.

The feature is named ‘Tukhchiev Knoll’ by the U.S. and British Antarctic naming committees; "Kuzman Knoll" is the official Bulgarian name, which is established among the Spanish and Bulgarian scientists working in the area.

First ascent by the Bulgarians Kuzman Tuhchiev and Vasil Gurev from St. Kliment Ohridski Base was during the 1994/95 season.

== Location ==
The knoll is located at 62°38′09.8″S 60°09′42.4″W which is 1.1 km north-northeast of Camp Academia site, 1.1 km east of the midpoint of Wörner Gap, 3.68 km east-northeast of the summit of Pliska Ridge, 4.07 km north-northeast of Mount Friesland, 3 km southeast of Mount Bowles and 3.32 km southwest of Atanasoff Nunatak (Bulgarian mapping in 1996, 2005 and 2009, from 1995/96 and 2004/05 topographic surveys respectively).

== Maps ==
- South Shetland Islands. Scale 1:200000 topographic map. DOS 610 Sheet W 62 60. Tolworth, UK, 1968.
- Islas Livingston y Decepción. Mapa topográfico a escala 1:100000. Madrid: Servicio Geográfico del Ejército, 1991.
- S. Soccol, D. Gildea and J. Bath. Livingston Island, Antarctica. Scale 1:100000 satellite map. The Omega Foundation, USA, 2004.
- L.L. Ivanov et al., Antarctica: Livingston Island and Greenwich Island, South Shetland Islands (from English Strait to Morton Strait, with illustrations and ice-cover distribution), 1:100000 scale topographic map, Antarctic Place-names Commission of Bulgaria, Sofia, 2005
- L.L. Ivanov. Antarctica: Livingston Island and Greenwich, Robert, Snow and Smith Islands. Scale 1:120000 topographic map. Troyan: Manfred Wörner Foundation, 2010. ISBN 978-954-92032-9-5 (First edition 2009. ISBN 978-954-92032-6-4)
- Antarctic Digital Database (ADD). Scale 1:250000 topographic map of Antarctica. Scientific Committee on Antarctic Research (SCAR), 1993–2016.
- A. Kamburov and L. Ivanov. Bowles Ridge and Central Tangra Mountains: Livingston Island, Antarctica. Scale 1:25000 map. Sofia: Manfred Wörner Foundation, 2023. ISBN 978-619-90008-6-1
