= Bowles Ridge =

Ridge on Livingston Island, Antarctica

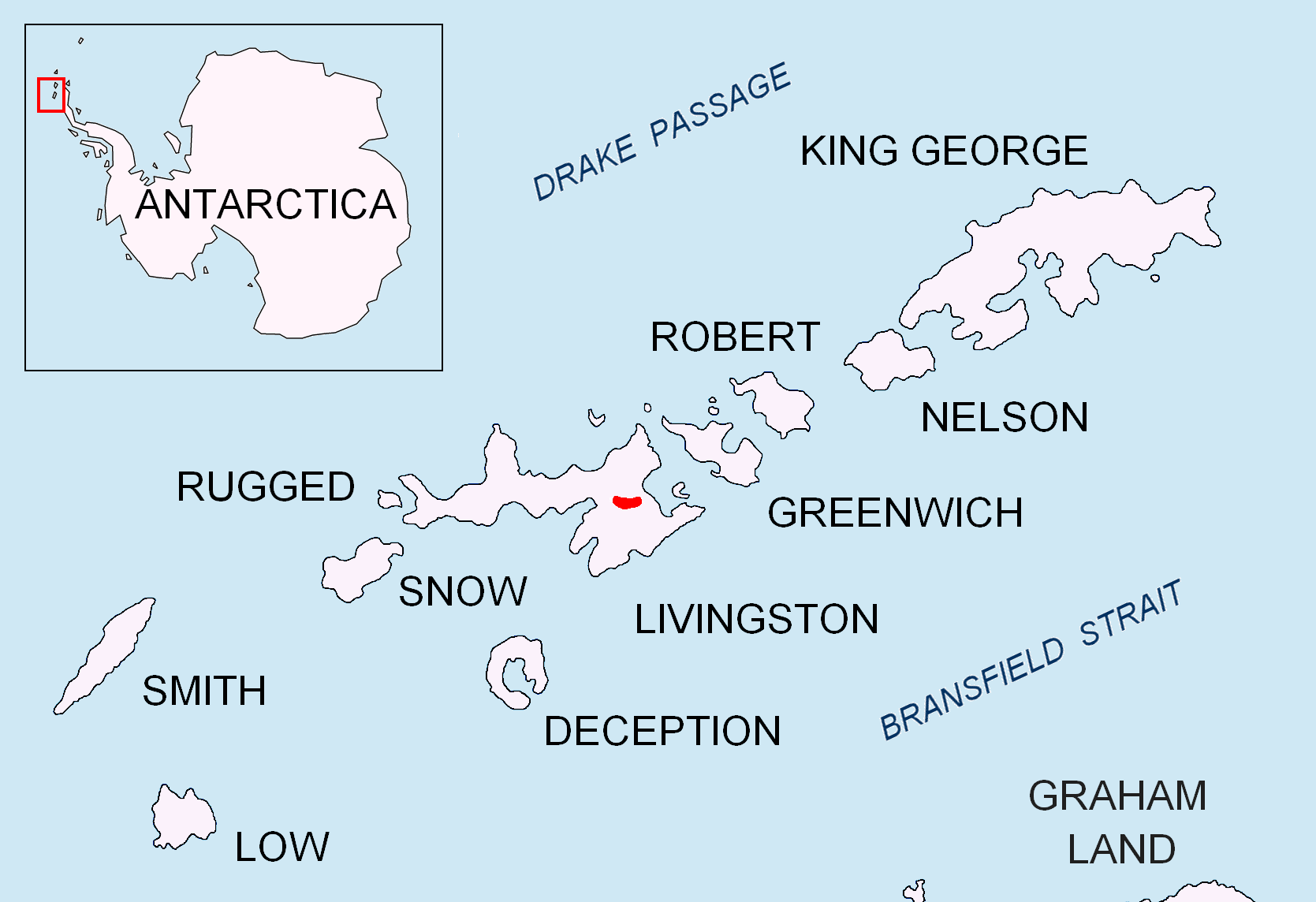
Location of Bowles Ridge on Livingston Island in the South Shetland Islands

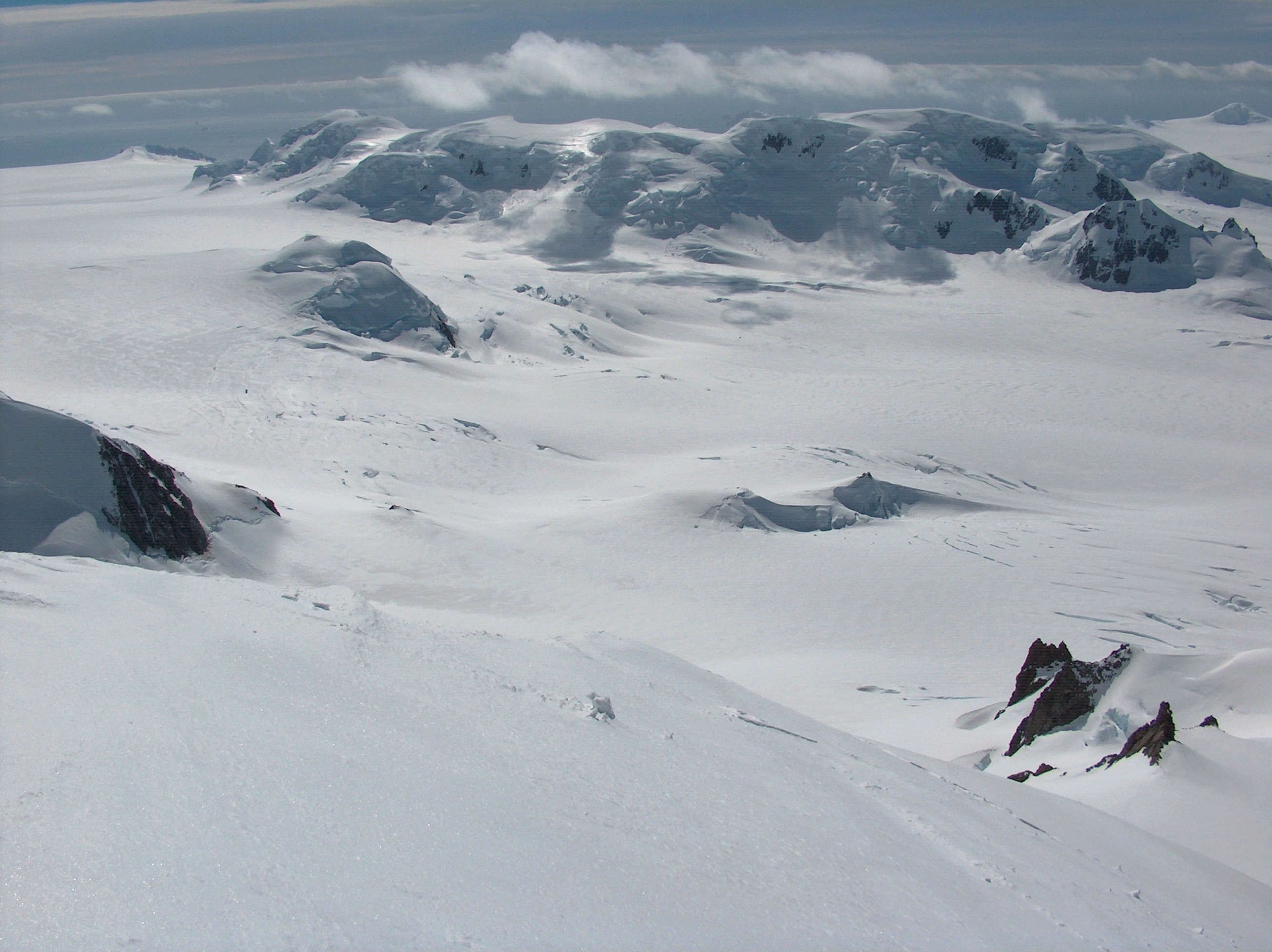
Bowles Ridge from Ongal Peak in Tangra Mountains, with Kuzman Knoll and upper Huron Glacier in the middle ground

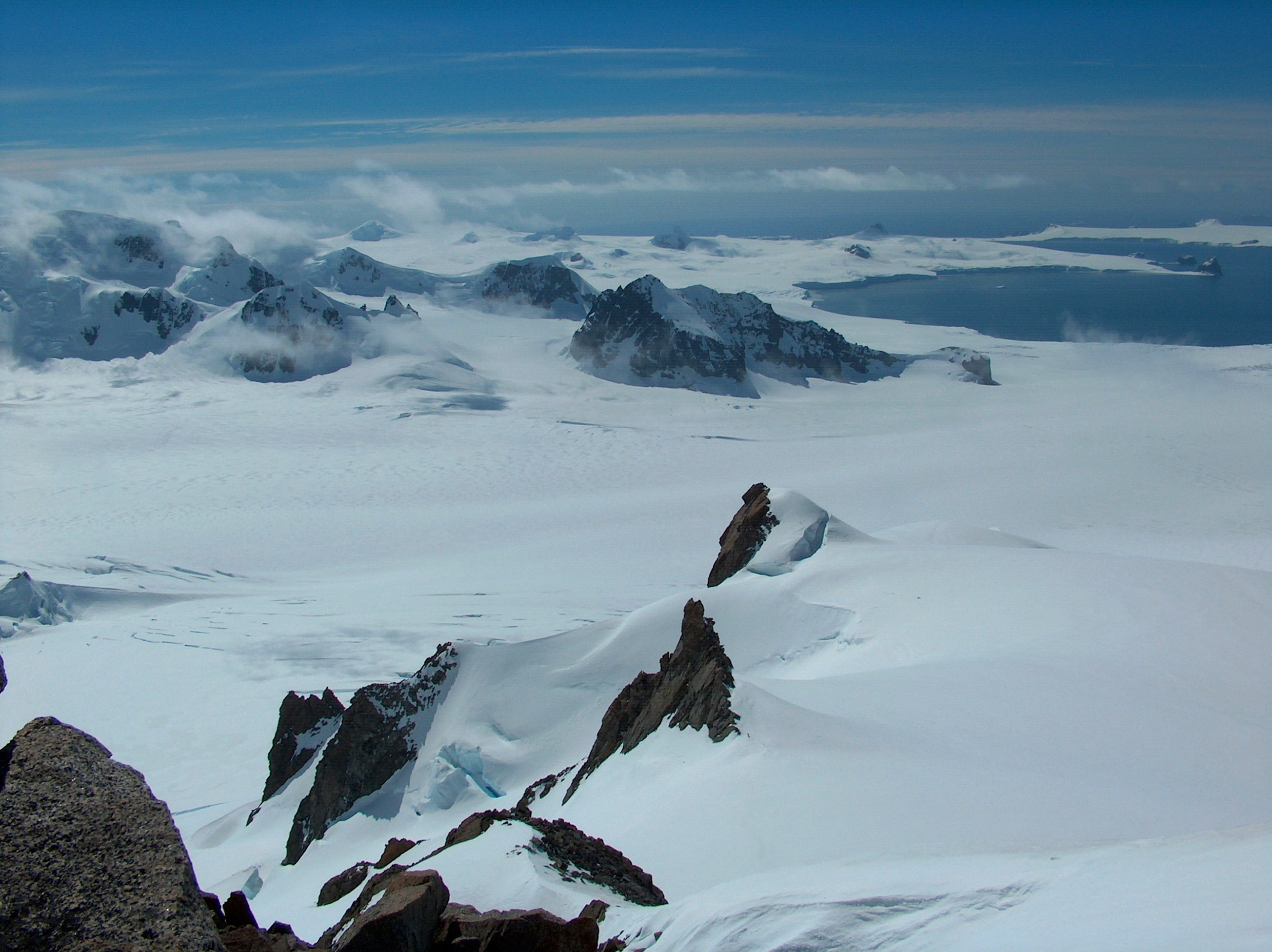
Eastern Bowles Ridge from Ongal Peak, with lower Huron Glacier in the middle ground

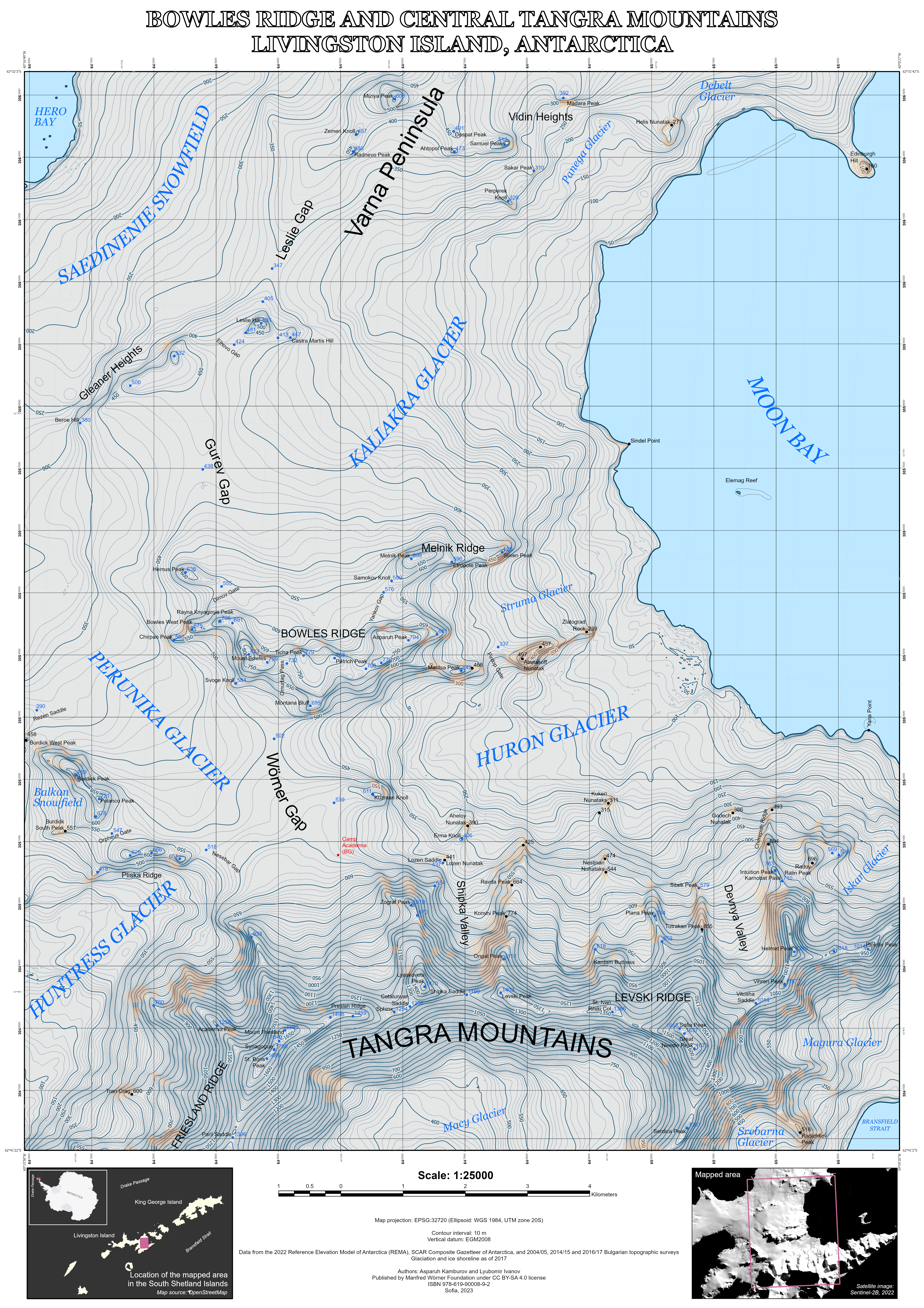
Topographic map of Bowles Ridge and central Tangra Mountains

Bowles Ridge (Bulgarian: хребет Боулс, romanized: hrebet Bouls, IPA: [ˈxrɛbɛd ˈbɔuɫs]) is the central ridge of eastern Livingston Island. The ridge extends 6.5 km in the east-west direction and is 1.5 km wide. The summit of the ridge is Mount Bowles which rises to 822m and is located 9.77 km northwest of Great Needle Peak, 6.08 km north by west of Mount Friesland, 8.77 km east-northeast of St. Kliment Ohridski base and 9.25 km south by west of Miziya Peak.

Bowles Ridge is bounded by Kaliakra Glacier and Struma Glacier to the north, by Perunika Glacier to the west and southwest and by Huron Glacier to the southeast and east. It is linked to Friesland Ridge of the Tangra Mountains by Wörner Gap, to Hemus Peak by Dimov Gate, and to Melnik Ridge by Yankov Gap. The ridge is crossed by Omurtag Pass and Pirdop Gate.

The feature takes its name from Mount Bowles.

== Location ==
The ridge is centred at 62°37′00″S 60°10′20″W. It was mapped by the British in 1968 and surveyed by Bulgarian topographic surveys in 1995/6 and 2004/5 with mapping in 2005 and 2009.

== See also ==
- Montana Bluff

== Maps ==
- South Shetland Islands. Scale 1:200000 topographic map No. 5657. DOS 610 – W 62 60. Tolworth, UK, 1968.
- Islas Livingston y Decepción. Mapa topográfico a escala 1:100000. Madrid: Servicio Geográfico del Ejército, 1991.
- L.L. Ivanov et al. Antarctica: Livingston Island and Greenwich Island, South Shetland Islands. Scale 1:100000 topographic map. Sofia: Antarctic Place-names Commission of Bulgaria, 2005.
- L.L. Ivanov. Antarctica: Livingston Island and Greenwich, Robert, Snow and Smith Islands. Scale 1:120000 topographic map. Troyan: Manfred Wörner Foundation, 2009. ISBN 978-954-92032-6-4
- Antarctic Digital Database (ADD). Scale 1:250000 topographic map of Antarctica. Scientific Committee on Antarctic Research (SCAR). Since 1993, regularly upgraded and updated.
- L.L. Ivanov. Antarctica: Livingston Island and Smith Island. Scale 1:100000 topographic map. Manfred Wörner Foundation, 2017. ISBN 978-619-90008-3-0
- A. Kamburov and L. Ivanov. Bowles Ridge and Central Tangra Mountains: Livingston Island, Antarctica. Scale 1:25000 map. Sofia: Manfred Wörner Foundation, 2023. ISBN 978-619-90008-6-1
