= Chepelare Peak =

Mountain in the Antarctic

Location of Tangra Mountains on Livingston Island in the South Shetland Islands.

Topographic map of Livingston Island, Greenwich, Robert, Snow and Smith Islands.

Chepelare Peak (Bulgarian: връх Чепеларе, romanized: vrah Chepelare, IPA: [ˈvrɤx t͡ʃɛpɛˈɫarɛ]) rises to approximately 900 m in the Friesland Ridge, Tangra Mountains, Livingston Island. The peak surmounts Charity Glacier to the west and Prespa Glacier to the southeast and is named after the Bulgarian town of Chepelare.

First climbed by the Bulgarians Marcho Paunov and Doychin Boyanov on 14 January 2024.

== Location ==
The peak is located at 62°43′18.3″S 60°15′04″W which is 700 m south-southwest of St. Methodius Peak, 1.07 km southeast of Tervel Peak and 850 m north of Shumen Peak. Bulgarian mapping in 2005 and 2009.

== Maps ==
- L.L. Ivanov et al. Antarctica: Livingston Island and Greenwich Island, South Shetland Islands. Scale 1:100000 topographic map. Sofia: Antarctic Place-names Commission of Bulgaria, 2005.
- L.L. Ivanov. Antarctica: Livingston Island and Greenwich, Robert, Snow and Smith Islands. Scale 1:120000 topographic map. Troyan: Manfred Wörner Foundation, 2009. ISBN 978-954-92032-6-4
