= Tervel Peak =

Peak on Livingston Island in the South Shetland Islands, Antarctica

Location of Tangra Mountains on Livingston Island in the South Shetland Islands.

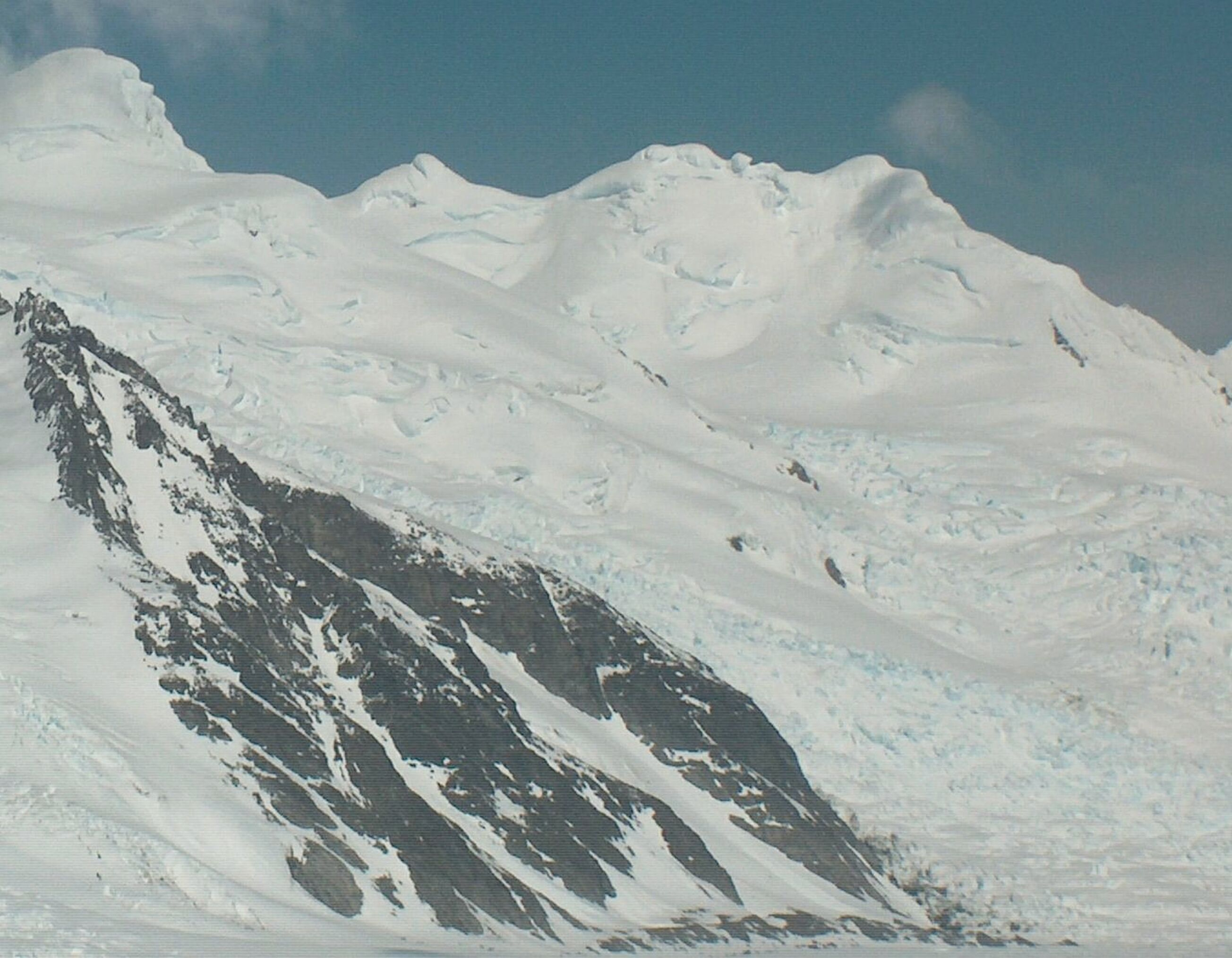
Tervel Peak from Willan Saddle, with the west wall of Kikish Crag in the foreground.

Topographic map of Livingston Island and Smith Island.

Tervel Peak (Bulgarian: връх Тервел, romanized: vrah Tervel, IPA: [ˈvrɤx ˈtɛrvɛɫ]) is a triple peak rising to 810 m in Friesland Ridge, Tangra Mountains on Livingston Island in the South Shetland Islands, Antarctica overlooking Peshtera Glacier and Zagore Beach to the northwest, and Charity Glacier to the southwest. Linked by Pleven Saddle to MacKay Peak in the west-southwest.

The peaks are named after Khan Tervel of Bulgaria who stopped the Arab invasion of Europe in 718 AD.

== Location ==
The peak is located at 62°43′01.7″S 60°16′10″W, which is 1.19 km west of St. Methodius Peak, 1.65 km northwest of Shumen Peak, 2.51 km northeast of Gabrovo Knoll, 2.66 km east-northeast of Canetti Peak, 1.59 km east-northeast of MacKay Peak and 2.55 km south-southwest of Kikish Crag (Bulgarian topographic survey in 1995/96, and mapping in 2005 and 2009).

== Maps ==
- South Shetland Islands. Scale 1:200000 topographic map No. 5657. DOS 610 – W 62 60. Tolworth, UK, 1968.
- Islas Livingston y Decepción. Mapa topográfico a escala 1:100000. Madrid: Servicio Geográfico del Ejército, 1991.
- S. Soccol, D. Gildea and J. Bath. Livingston Island, Antarctica. Scale 1:100000 satellite map. The Omega Foundation, USA, 2004.
- L.L. Ivanov et al., Antarctica: Livingston Island and Greenwich Island, South Shetland Islands (from English Strait to Morton Strait, with illustrations and ice-cover distribution), 1:100000 scale topographic map, Antarctic Place-names Commission of Bulgaria, Sofia, 2005
- L.L. Ivanov. Antarctica: Livingston Island and Greenwich, Robert, Snow and Smith Islands. Scale 1:120000 topographic map. Troyan: Manfred Wörner Foundation, 2010. ISBN 978-954-92032-9-5 (First edition 2009. ISBN 978-954-92032-6-4)
- Antarctic Digital Database (ADD). Scale 1:250000 topographic map of Antarctica. Scientific Committee on Antarctic Research (SCAR). Since 1993, regularly upgraded and updated.
- L.L. Ivanov. Antarctica: Livingston Island and Smith Island. Scale 1:100000 topographic map. Manfred Wörner Foundation, 2017. ISBN 978-619-90008-3-0
