= Vladaya Saddle =

Landmark

Location of Tangra Mountains on Livingston Island in the South Shetland Islands.

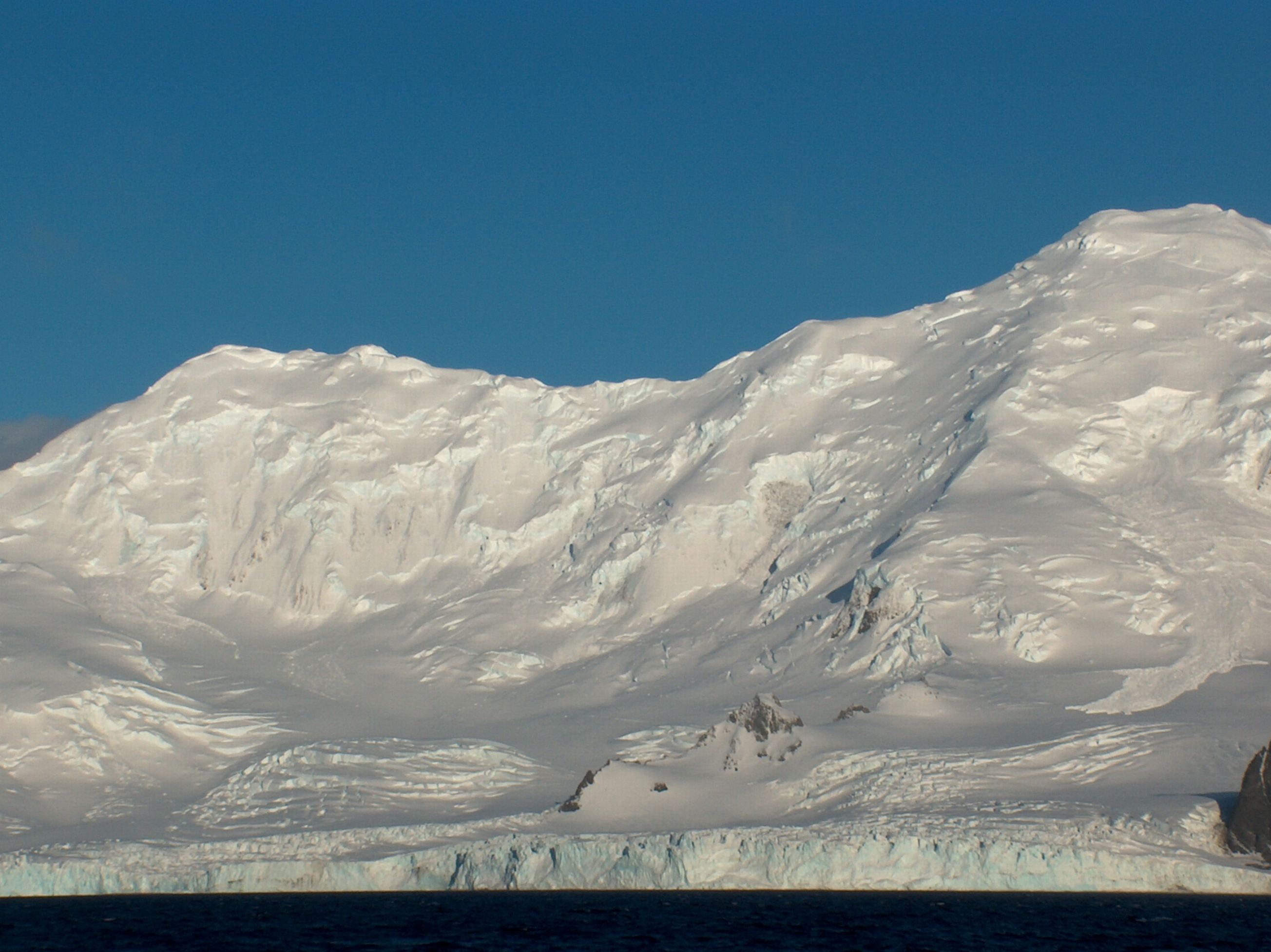
Vladaya Saddle from Bransfield Strait, with St. Methodius Peak to the left, St. Cyril Peak to the right, and Prespa Glacier in the foreground.

Topographic map of Livingston Island, Greenwich, Robert, Snow and Smith Islands.

Vladaya Saddle (Vladayska Sedlovina \vla-'day-ska se-dlo-vi-'na\) is a saddle of elevation 1000 m in the Friesland Ridge of Tangra Mountains, Livingston Island in the South Shetland Islands, Antarctica. Bounded by St. Cyril Peak to the northeast, and by St. Methodius Peak to the southwest. Overlooking Ruen Icefall to the northwest, and Prespa Glacier to the southeast. The feature is named after the settlement of Vladaya in western Bulgaria.

== Location ==
The saddle's midpoint is 62°42′44″S 60°13′53″W (Bulgarian topographic survey in 1995/96 and mapping in 2005 and 2009).

== Maps ==
- L.L. Ivanov et al. Antarctica: Livingston Island and Greenwich Island, South Shetland Islands. Scale 1:100000 topographic map. Sofia: Antarctic Place-names Commission of Bulgaria, 2005.
- L.L. Ivanov. Antarctica: Livingston Island and Greenwich, Robert, Snow and Smith Islands. Scale 1:120000 topographic map. Troyan: Manfred Wörner Foundation, 2009. ISBN 978-954-92032-6-4
