= Gabrovo Knoll =

Mountain in Antarctica

Location of Tangra Mountains on Livingston Island in the South Shetland Islands.

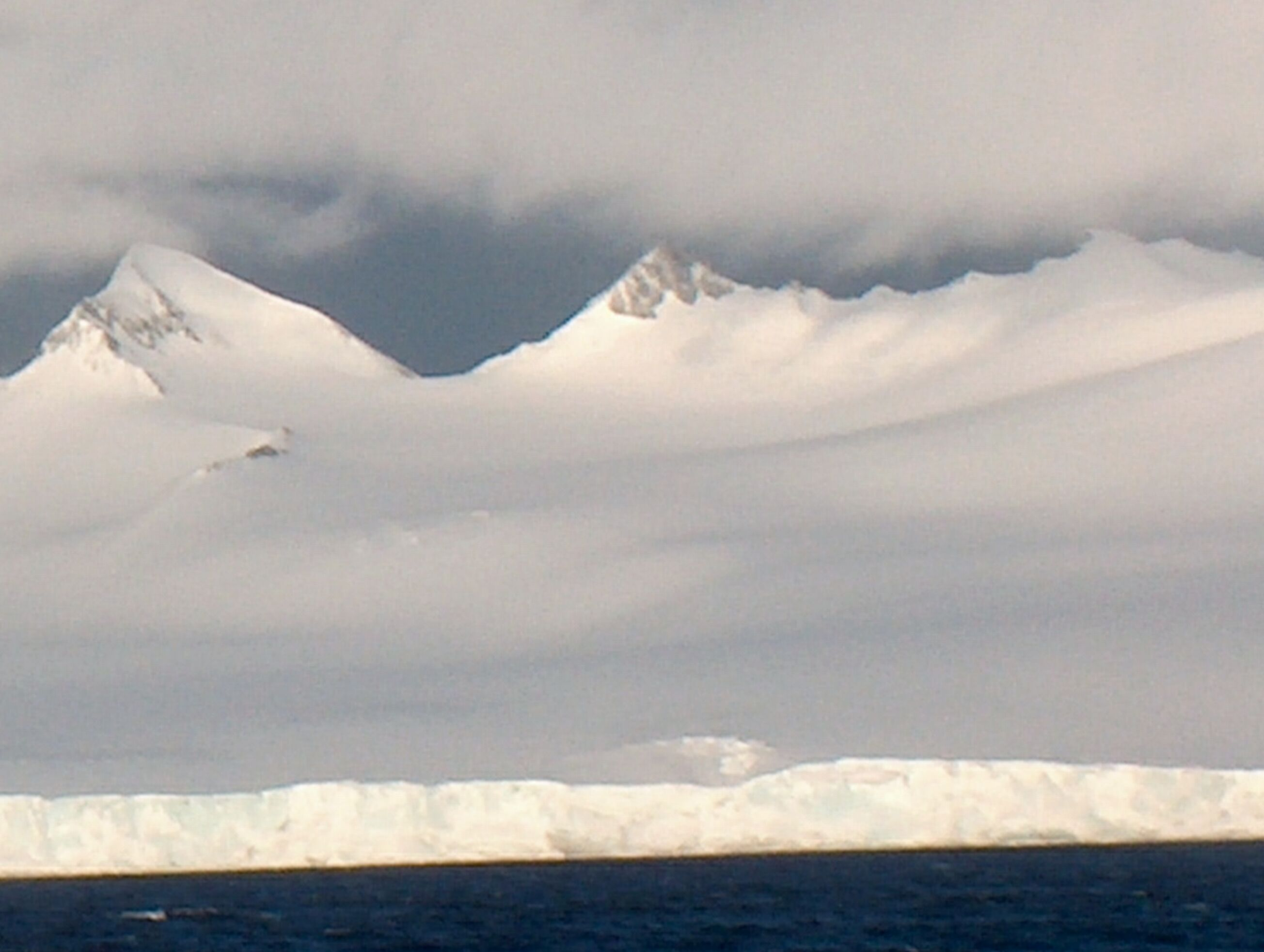
Gabrovo Knoll (in the centre).

Topographic map of Livingston Island and Smith Island.

Gabrovo Knoll (Bulgarian: връх Габрово, romanized: vrah Gabrovo, IPA: [ˈvrɤɣ ˈɡabrovo]) is a peak rising to 500m in the Friesland Ridge, Tangra Mountains, Livingston Island. The peak surmounts Charity Glacier to the north and Tarnovo Ice Piedmont to the southeast, and is separated from Shumen Peak to the east-northeast by Gerov Pass. The knoll is named after the Bulgarian town of Gabrovo.

== Location ==
The peak is located at 62°44′13.3″S 60°17′33″W, which is 1.8 km south of MacKay Peak, 2.26 km west-southwest of Shumen Peak, 430 m north of Arda Peak and 1 km northeast of Veleka Peak (Bulgarian mapping in 2005 and 2009).

== Maps ==
- L.L. Ivanov et al. Antarctica: Livingston Island and Greenwich Island, South Shetland Islands. Scale 1:100000 topographic map. Sofia: Antarctic Place-names Commission of Bulgaria, 2005.
- L.L. Ivanov. Antarctica: Livingston Island and Greenwich, Robert, Snow and Smith Islands. Scale 1:120000 topographic map. Troyan: Manfred Wörner Foundation, 2009. ISBN 978-954-92032-6-4
