= Pleven Saddle =

Saddle in Friesland Ridge, Tangra Mountains, Livingston Island, Antarctica

Location of Tangra Mountains on Livingston Island in the South Shetland Islands.

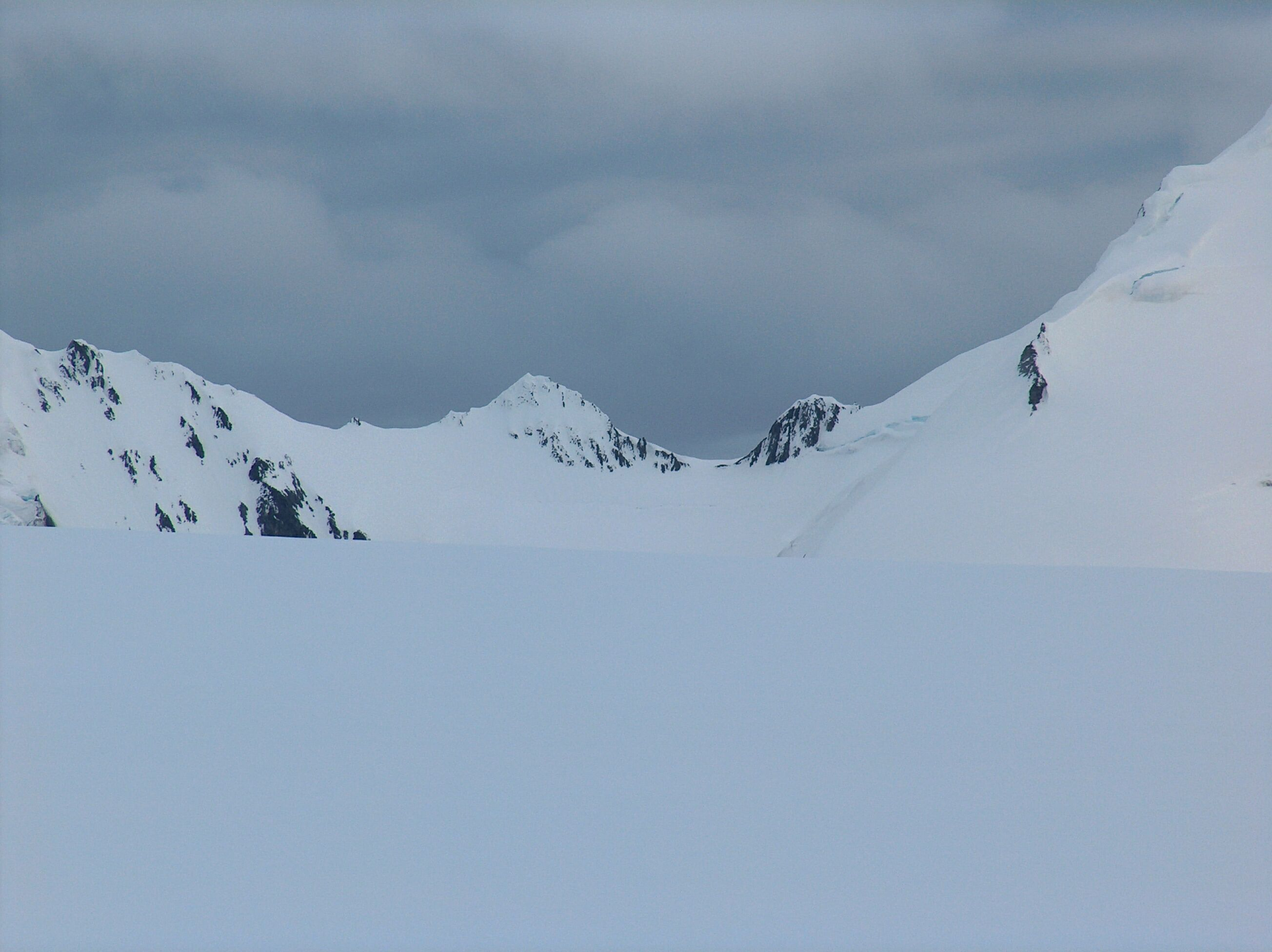
Pleven Saddle from Johnsons Glacier.

Topographic map of Livingston Island, Greenwich, Robert, Snow and Smith Islands.

Pleven Saddle (Plevenska Sedlovina \'ple-ven-ska se-dlo-vi-'na\) is a deep saddle of elevation 500 m in Friesland Ridge, Tangra Mountains, Livingston Island, Antarctica, bounded by MacKay Peak to the west-southwest and Tervel Peak to the east-northeast, with two conspicuous rocks rising on it. Part of the glacial divide between Peshtera Glacier to the north and Charity Glacier to the south.

The saddle was “named after the Bulgarian city of Pleven, and in connection with the freezer vessel Pleven of the Bulgarian company Ocean Fisheries – Burgas whose ships operated in the waters of South Georgia, Kerguelen, the South Orkney Islands, South Shetland Islands and Antarctic Peninsula from 1970 to the early 1990s. The Bulgarian fishermen, along with those of the Soviet Union, Poland and East Germany are the pioneers of modern Antarctic fishing industry.”

== Location ==
The saddle is centred at 62°43′12″S 60°17′24″W which is 490 m east-northeast of MacKay Peak, 1.09 km west-southwest of Tervel Peak and 1.6 km north by west of Gerov Pass.

== Maps ==
- L.L. Ivanov et al. Antarctica: Livingston Island and Greenwich Island, South Shetland Islands. Scale 1:100000 topographic map. Sofia: Antarctic Place-names Commission of Bulgaria, 2005.
- L.L. Ivanov. Antarctica: Livingston Island and Greenwich, Robert, Snow and Smith Islands. Scale 1:120000 topographic map. Troyan: Manfred Wörner Foundation, 2009.
