= Gerov Pass =

Location of Tangra Mountains on Livingston Island in the South Shetland Islands.

Topographic map of Livingston Island, Greenwich, Robert, Snow and Smith Islands.

Gerov Pass (Bulgarian: Геров проход, ‘Gerov Prohod’ \'ge-rov 'pro-hod\) is a pass of elevation 400 m in Friesland Ridge, Tangra Mountains on Livingston Island in the South Shetland Islands, Antarctica. Situated on Rozhen Peninsula, 1.6 km south-southeast of Pleven Saddle. Bounded by Shumen Peak to the east-northeast, and Gabrovo Knoll to the west-southwest. Providing overland access between Charity Glacier to the northwest and Tarnovo Ice Piedmont to the south. Bulgarian topographic survey Tangra 2004/05. Named after the Bulgarian linguist Nayden Gerov (1823–1900).

== Location ==
Gerov Pass is located at 62°44′05″S 60°16′54″W. British mapping in 1968, Spanish in 1991 and Bulgarian in 2005 and 2009.

== Map ==
- L.L. Ivanov. Antarctica: Livingston Island and Greenwich, Robert, Snow and Smith Islands. Scale 1:120000 topographic map. Troyan: Manfred Wörner Foundation, 2009. ISBN 978-954-92032-6-4
