= Gerov =

Gerov (masculine, Bulgarian: Геров) or Gerova (feminine, Bulgarian: Герова) is a Bulgarian surname. Notable people with the surname include:

- Atanas Gerov (born 1945), Bulgarian footballer
- Nayden Gerov (1823–1900), Bulgarian linguist, folklorist and writer

== See also ==
- Gerov Pass, mountain pass of Antarctica
