= Peshtera Glacier =

Glacier in Antarctica

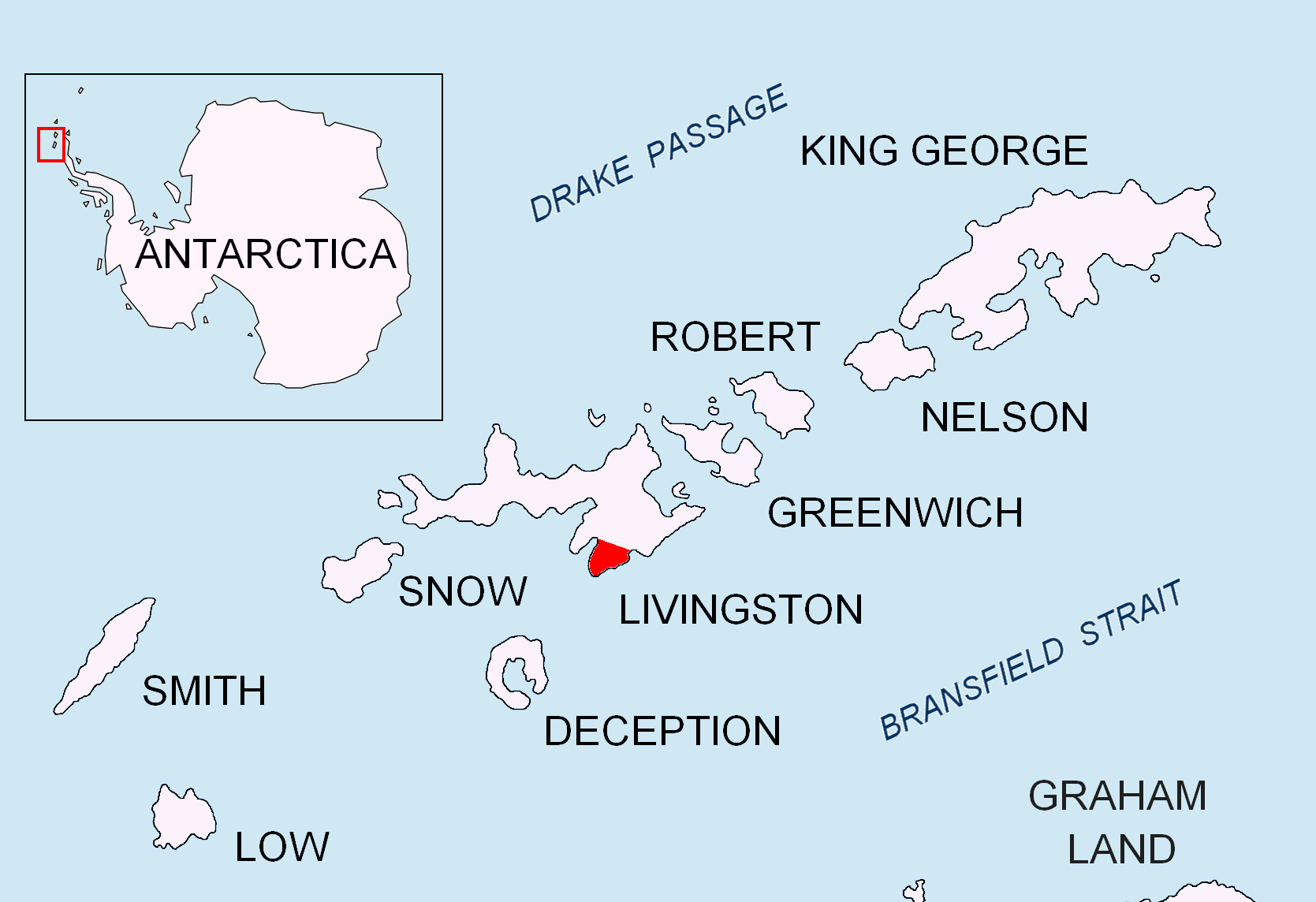
- Location of Rozhen Peninsula on Livingston Island in the South Shetland Islands

- Location within South Shetland Islands Location within Antarctica
- Location: Livingston Island; South Shetland Islands
- Coordinates: 62°42′40″S 60°18′00″W
- Length: 1 nautical mile (1.9 km; 1.2 mi)
- Thickness: unknown
- Terminus: Zagore Beach
- Status: unknown

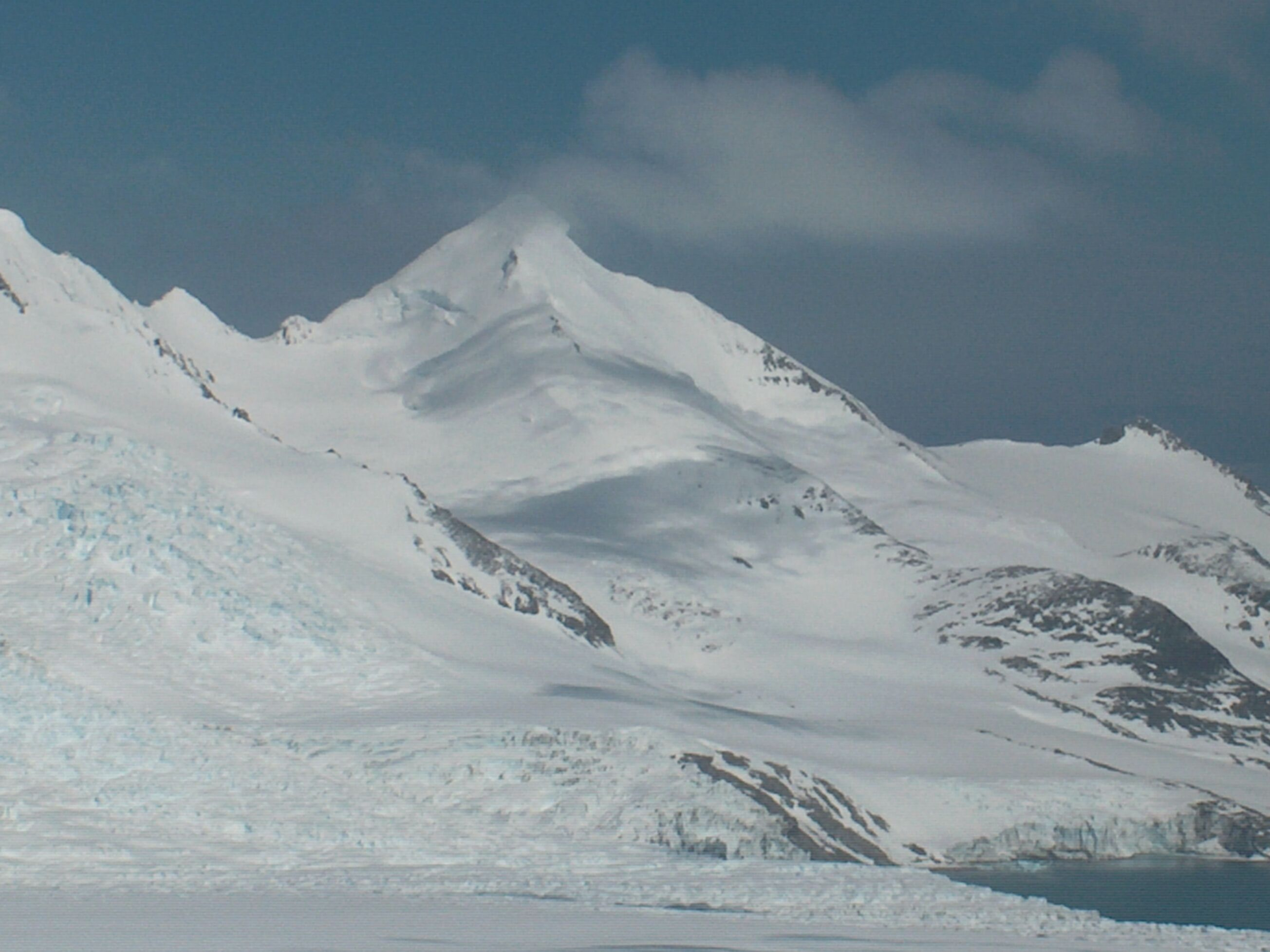
Peshtera Glacier from Willan Saddle.

Topographic map of Livingston Island and Smith Island

The Peshtera Glacier (Bulgarian Lednik Peshtera) is a glacier on the Rozhen Peninsula, Livingston Island in the South Shetland Islands, Antarctica situated southwest of Ruen Icefall and north of Charity Glacier.

The head of the glacier is bounded by MacKay Peak (approx. 700 m) to the southwest and Tervel Peak to the east. It flows 2 km north-northwestward to terminate at the northeast extremity of Zagore Beach. The feature is named after the Bulgarian town of Peshtera, in Pazardzhik Province.

== Location ==
The glacier is centred at 62°42′40″S 60°18′00″W. Bulgarian mapping in 2005 and 2009.

== See also ==
- List of glaciers in the Antarctic
- Glaciology

== Maps ==
- L.L. Ivanov et al. Antarctica: Livingston Island and Greenwich Island, South Shetland Islands. Scale 1:100000 topographic map. Sofia: Antarctic Place-names Commission of Bulgaria, 2005.
- L.L. Ivanov. Antarctica: Livingston Island and Greenwich, Robert, Snow and Smith Islands. Scale 1:120000 topographic map. Troyan: Manfred Wörner Foundation, 2009. ISBN 978-954-92032-6-4
