= Canetti Peak =

Peak on Livingston Island, Antarctica

Location of Tangra Mountains on Livingston Island in the South Shetland Islands

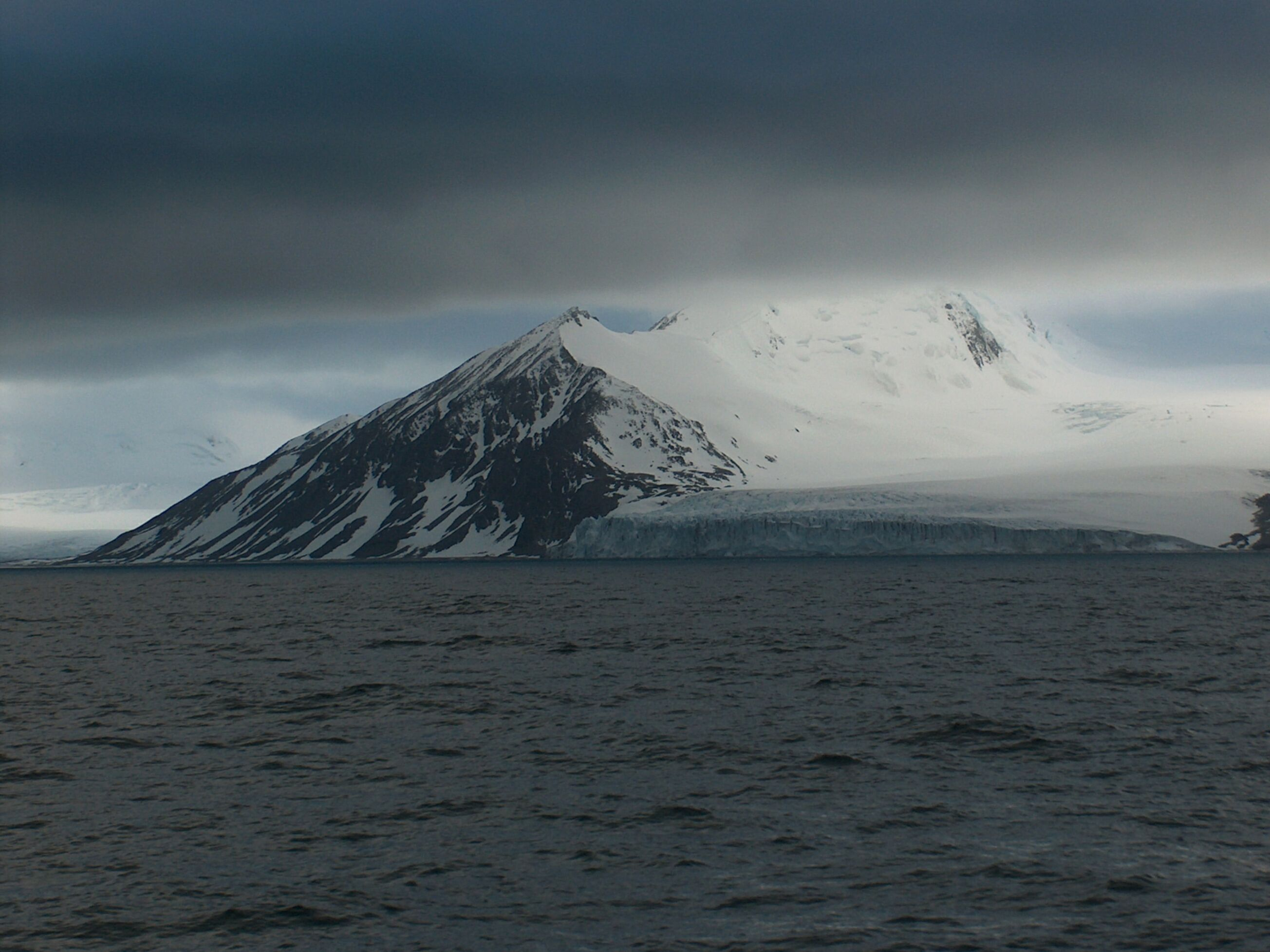
Canetti Peak, southwest view with Zagore Beach on the left and Charity Glacier on the right

Topographic map of Livingston Island and Smith Island

Canetti Peak (Bulgarian: връх Канети, romanized: vrah Kaneti, IPA: [ˈvrɤx kɐˈnɛti]) is a 400 m peak in the Friesland Ridge, Tangra Mountains, eastern Livingston Island in the South Shetland Islands, Antarctica. The peak has precipitous and ice-free western slopes and overlooks Zagore Beach and False Bay to the west and north, and Charity Glacier to the south. The peak was named after Elias Canetti (1905–1994), a Bulgarian-born Nobel laureate in literature.

== Location ==
The peak is located at 62°43′25.3″S 60°19′10″W which is 1.06 km west-southwest of MacKay Peak, 2.13 km north by west of the summit of Veleka Ridge and 1.62 km south-southeast of Ogosta Point.

The peak was mapped by Bulgaria in 2005 and 2009.

== Maps ==
- L.L. Ivanov et al. Antarctica: Livingston Island and Greenwich Island, South Shetland Islands. Scale 1:100000 topographic map. Sofia: Antarctic Place-names Commission of Bulgaria, 2005.
- L.L. Ivanov. Antarctica: Livingston Island and Greenwich, Robert, Snow and Smith Islands. Scale 1:120000 topographic map. Troyan: Manfred Wörner Foundation, 2009. ISBN 978-954-92032-6-4
