= Tervel (disambiguation) =

Tervel of Bulgaria (675–721) was the ruler of Bulgaria from 700 to 721.

Tervel may also refer to:

- Tervel (town), Dobrich Province, Bulgaria
- Tervel Municipality, Dobrich, Bulgaria
- Tervel Peak, mountain in Antarctica's Livingston Island
- Tervel Pulev (born 1983), Bulgarian boxer
- Tervel Zamfirov (born 2005), Bulgarian snowboarder
