= Shumen Peak =

Location of Tangra Mountains on Livingston Island in the South Shetland Islands.

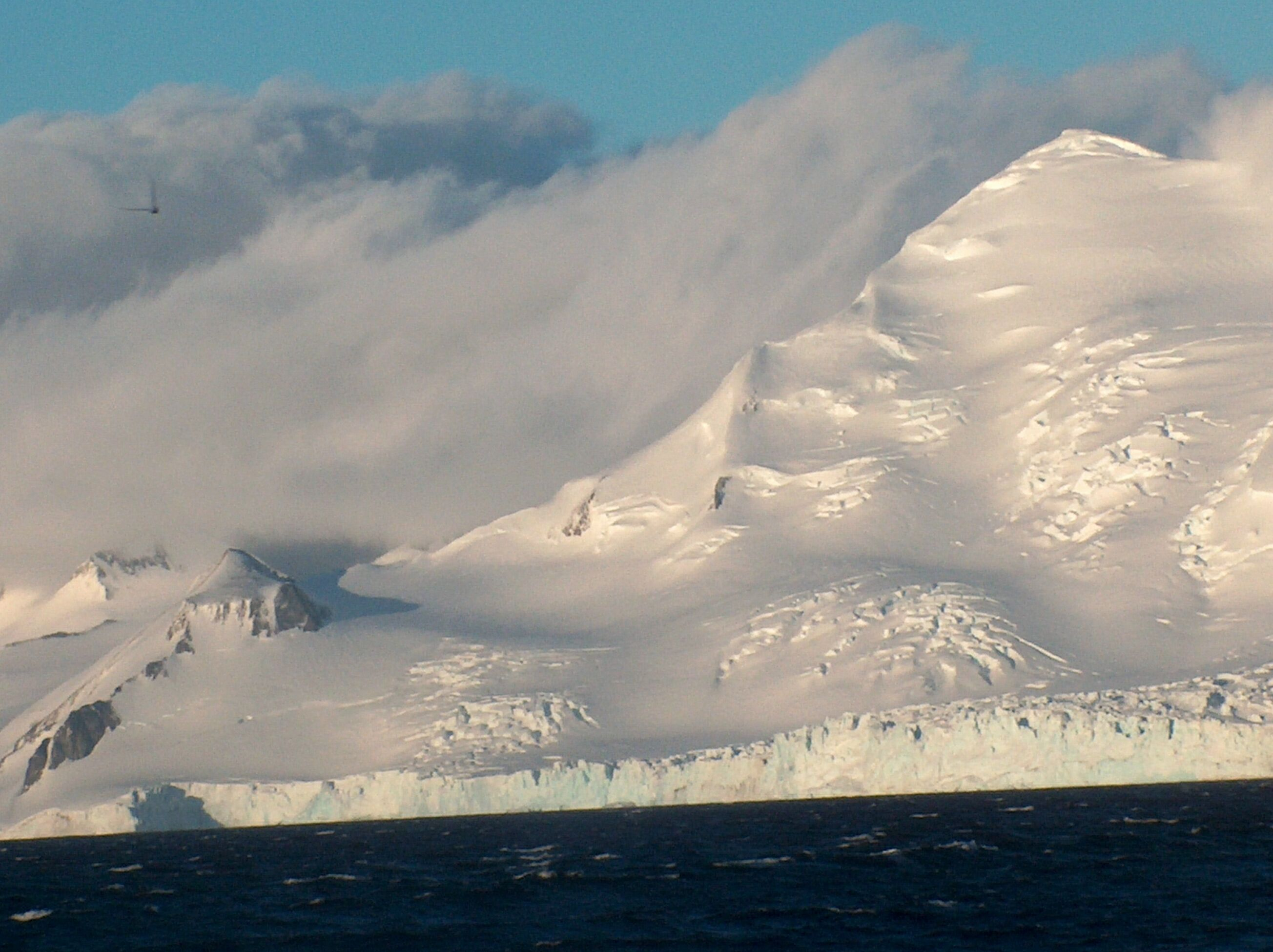
Shumen Peak from Bransfield Strait.

Topographic map of Livingston Island and Smith Island.

Shumen Peak (Bulgarian: връх Шумен, romanized: vrah Shumen, IPA: [ˈvrɤx ˈʃumɛn]) rises to 770 m in Friesland Ridge, Tangra Mountains, Livingston Island, Antarctica and surmounts Charity Glacier to the west, Tarnovo Ice Piedmont to the south, and Prespa Glacier to the southeast. The peak is named after the Bulgarian town of Shumen.

== Location ==
The peak is located at 62°43′45.9″S 60°15′05″W, which is 1.53 km south of St. Methodius Peak, 850 m south of Chepelare Peak, 4.42 km west of Needle Peak, 1.65 km southeast of Tervel Peak, 1.44 km north-northwest of Yambol Peak and 3.29 km east-northeast of Veleka Peak (Bulgarian mapping in 2005 and 2009).

== Maps ==
- South Shetland Islands. Scale 1:200000 topographic map. DOS 610 Sheet W 62 60. Tolworth, UK, 1968.
- Islas Livingston y Decepción. Mapa topográfico a escala 1:100000. Madrid: Servicio Geográfico del Ejército, 1991.
- S. Soccol, D. Gildea and J. Bath. Livingston Island, Antarctica. Scale 1:100000 satellite map. The Omega Foundation, USA, 2004.
- L.L. Ivanov et al., Antarctica: Livingston Island and Greenwich Island, South Shetland Islands (from English Strait to Morton Strait, with illustrations and ice-cover distribution), 1:100000 scale topographic map, Antarctic Place-names Commission of Bulgaria, Sofia, 2005
- L.L. Ivanov. Antarctica: Livingston Island and Greenwich, Robert, Snow and Smith Islands. Scale 1:120000 topographic map. Troyan: Manfred Wörner Foundation, 2010. ISBN 978-954-92032-9-5 (First edition 2009. ISBN 978-954-92032-6-4)
- Antarctic Digital Database (ADD). Scale 1:250000 topographic map of Antarctica. Scientific Committee on Antarctic Research (SCAR), 1993–2016.
