= Ruen Icefall =

Icefall on Rozhen Peninsula in eastern Livingston Island

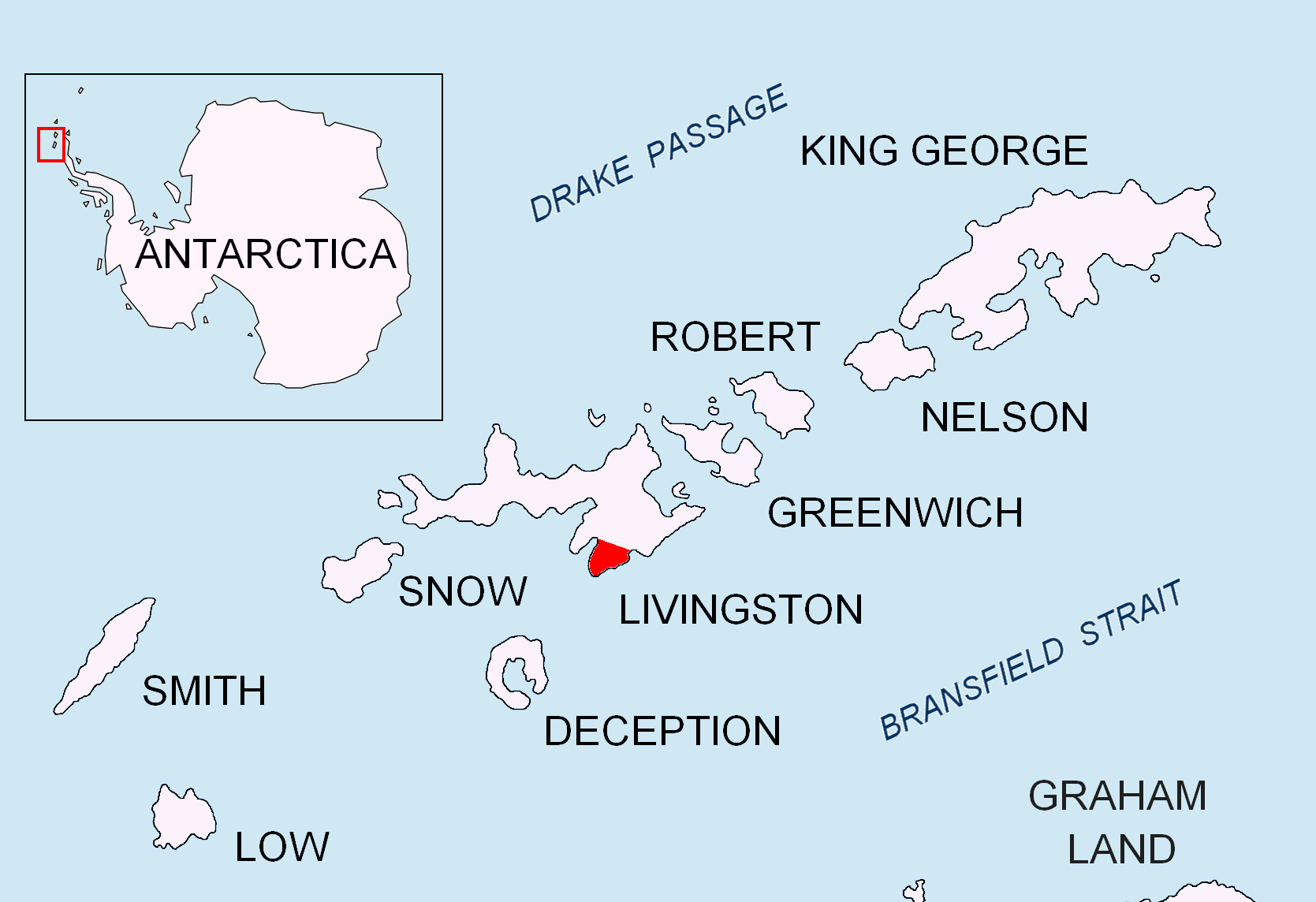
Location of Rozhen Peninsula on Livingston Island in the South Shetland Islands.

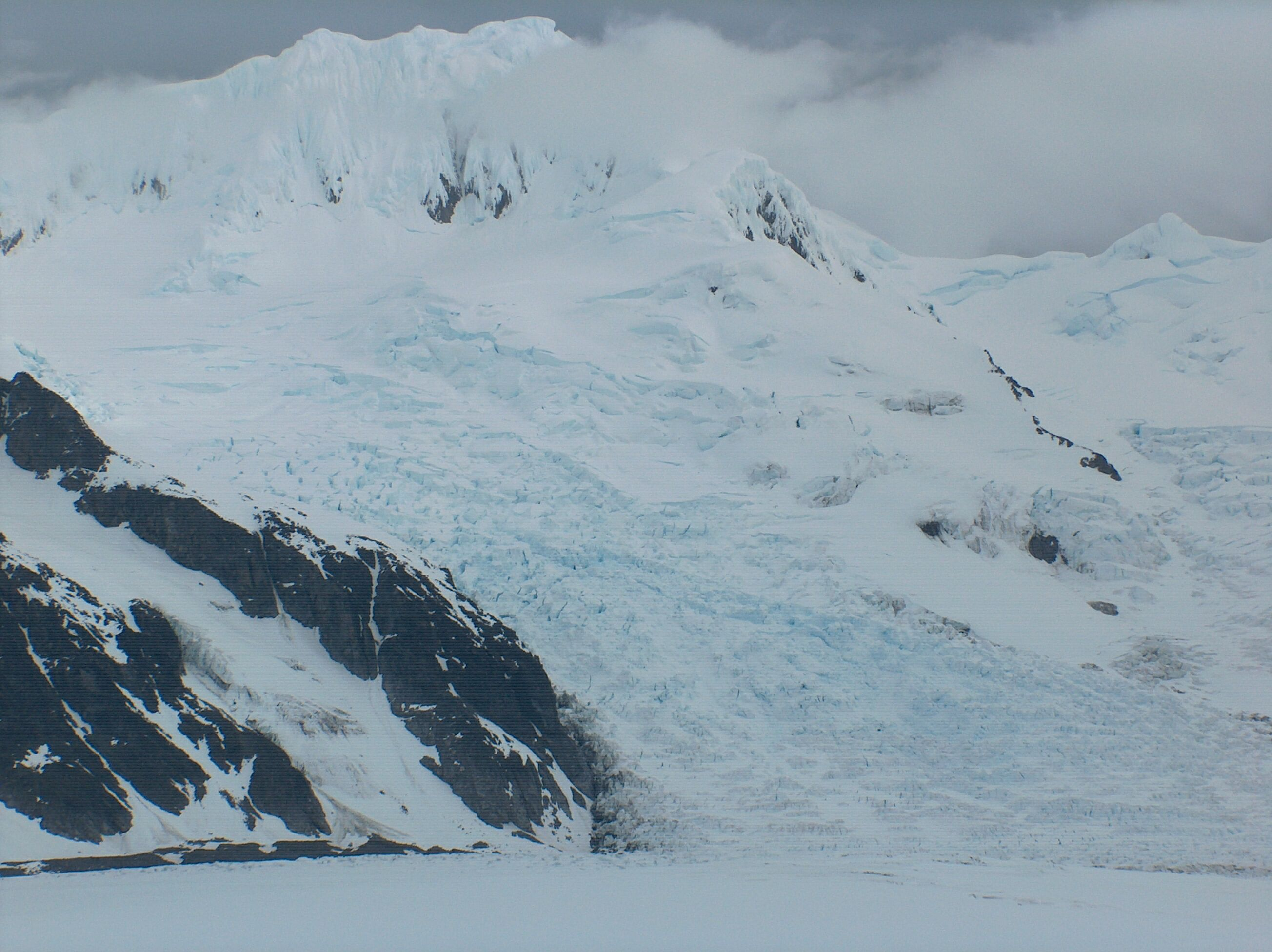
Ruen Icefall from Johnsons Glacier.

Topographic map of Livingston Island, Greenwich, Robert, Snow and Smith Islands.

The Ruen Icefall (Bulgarian: ледопад Руен, romanized: ledopad Ruen, IPA: [lɛdoˈpat ˈruɛn]) on Rozhen Peninsula in eastern Livingston Island, South Shetland Islands in Antarctica is situated south of Huntress Glacier, northwest of Prespa Glacier and northeast of Peshtera and Charity Glaciers. It descends towards False Bay from the circus overlooked by Simeon Peak, St. Cyril Peak and St. Methodius Peak in Friesland Ridge, Tangra Mountains.

Ruen is the summit of Osogovo Mountain in south-western Bulgaria.

== Location ==
The icefall is centered at 62°42′03″S 60°16′04″W, which is 2 km north-northwest of St. Methodius Peak, 3.43 km east-northeast of Ogosta Point, and 4.39 km southeast of Napier Peak on Hurd Peninsula (UK Directorate of Overseas Surveys mapping in 1968, Spanish in 1991 and Bulgarian in 2005 and 2009).

== Maps ==
- L.L. Ivanov et al. Antarctica: Livingston Island and Greenwich Island, South Shetland Islands. Scale 1:100000 topographic map. Sofia: Antarctic Place-names Commission of Bulgaria, 2005.
- L.L. Ivanov. Antarctica: Livingston Island and Greenwich, Robert, Snow and Smith Islands. Scale 1:120000 topographic map. Troyan: Manfred Wörner Foundation, 2009. ISBN 978-954-92032-6-4
