= Zagore Beach =

Beach in Antarctica

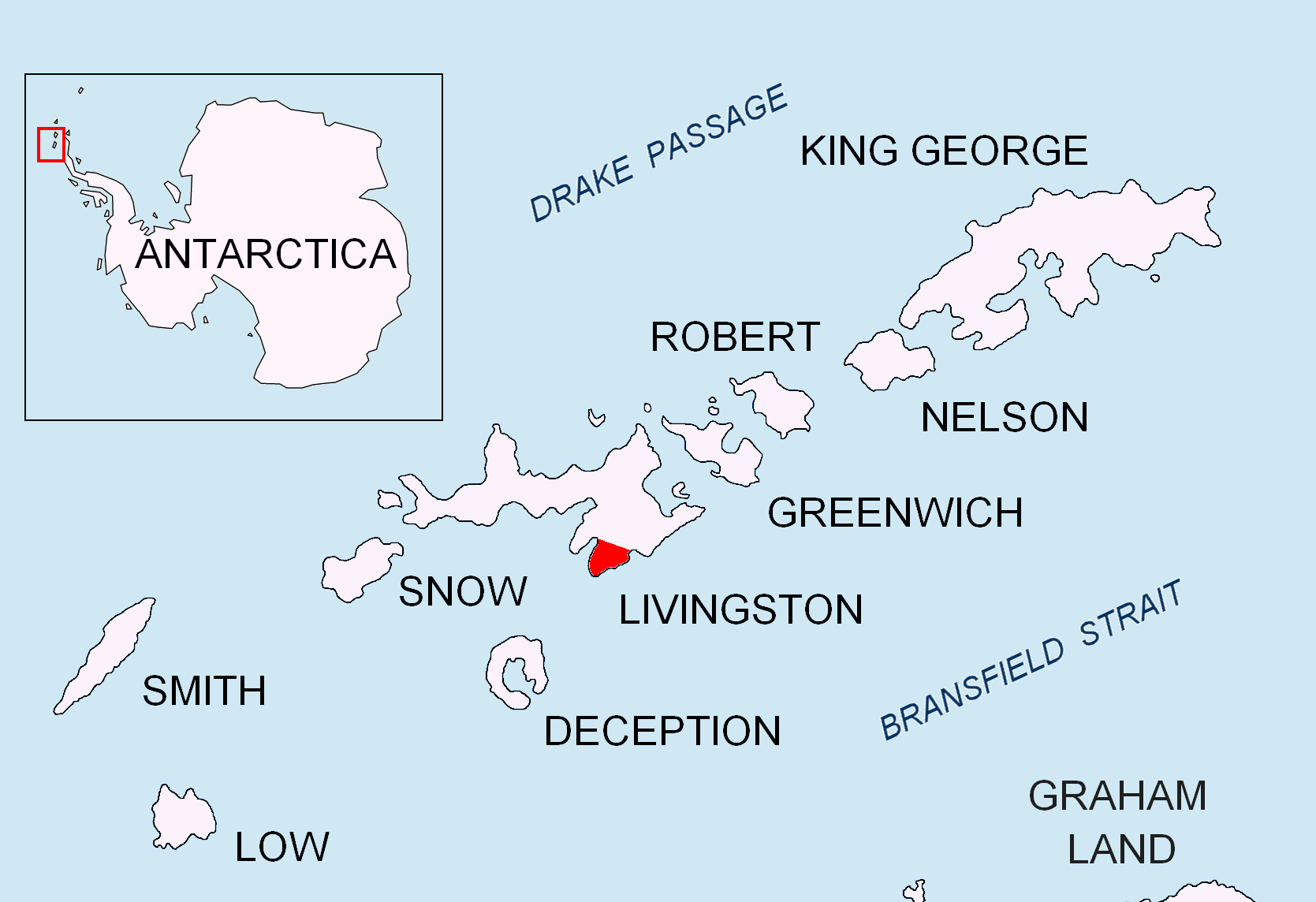
Location of Livingston Island in the South Shetland Islands

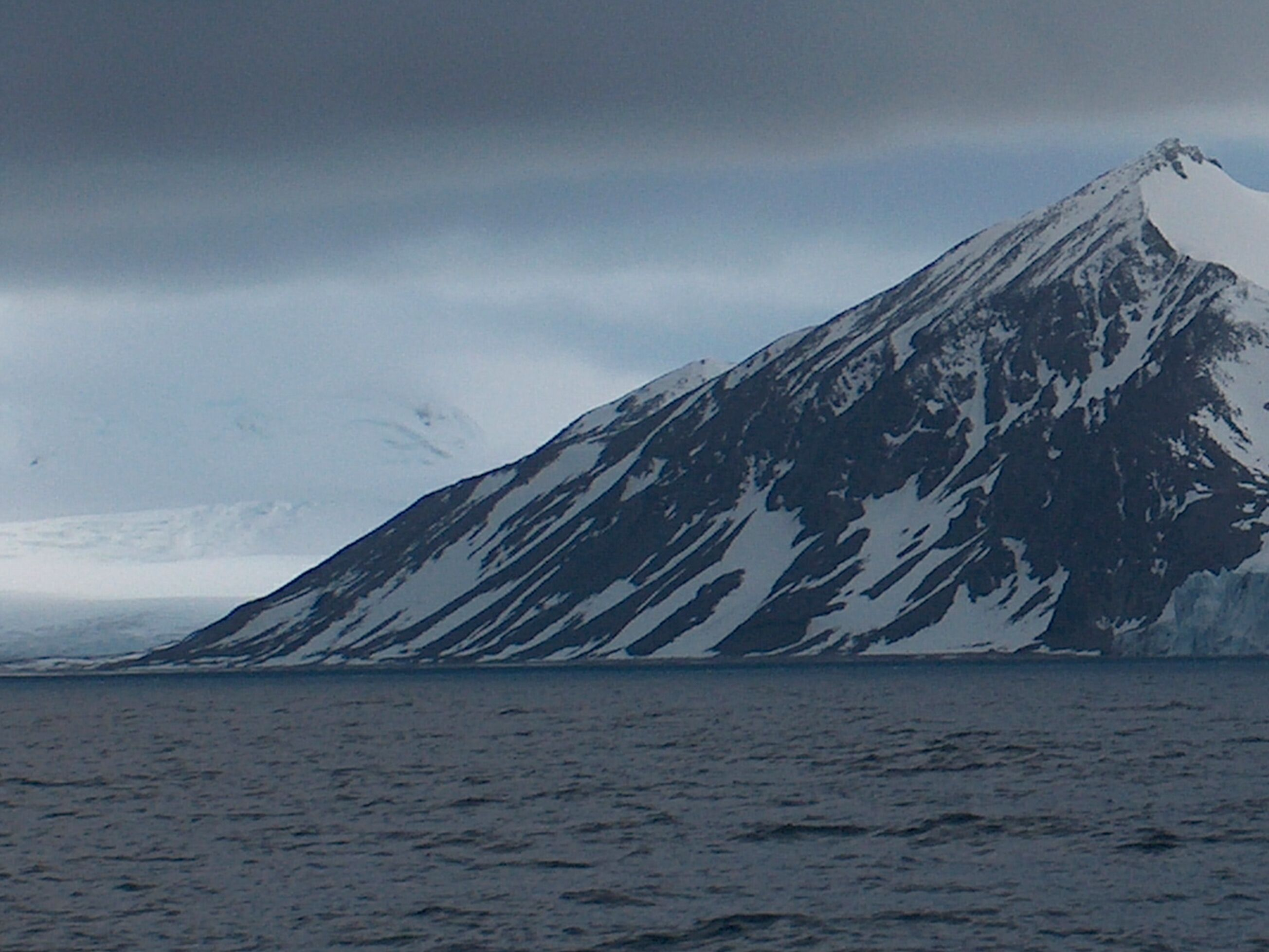
Zagore Beach from southwest, with Canetti Peak on the right

Topographic map of Livingston Island and Smith Island

Zagore Beach (Bulgarian: Загорски бряг, romanized: Zagorski bryag, IPA: [zɐˈɡɔrski ˈbrʲak]) faces False Bay on Livingston Island, Antarctica and extends for 4 km on the Rozhen Peninsula between Charity Glacier and the Ruen Icefall. The beach is surmounted by Canetti Peak (400 m) and MacKay Peak (approx 700 m). Surface area 220 hectares (540 acres).

The beach is named after the historic region of Zagore situated south of the Balkan Mountains in Bulgaria.

== Location ==
The midpoint of the beach is located at 62°42′46″S 60°19′23″W (Bulgarian mapping in 2005 and 2009).

== Maps ==
- L.L. Ivanov et al. Antarctica: Livingston Island and Greenwich Island, South Shetland Islands. Scale 1:100000 topographic map. Sofia: Antarctic Place-names Commission of Bulgaria, 2005.
- L.L. Ivanov. Antarctica: Livingston Island and Greenwich, Robert, Snow and Smith Islands. Scale 1:120000 topographic map. Troyan: Manfred Wörner Foundation, 2010. ISBN 978-954-92032-9-5 (First edition 2009. ISBN 978-954-92032-6-4)
- Antarctic Digital Database (ADD). Scale 1:250000 topographic map of Antarctica. Scientific Committee on Antarctic Research (SCAR). Since 1993, regularly updated.
- L.L. Ivanov. Antarctica: Livingston Island and Smith Island. Scale 1:100000 topographic map. Manfred Wörner Foundation, 2017. ISBN 978-619-90008-3-0
