= Prespa Glacier =

Glacier in Antarctica

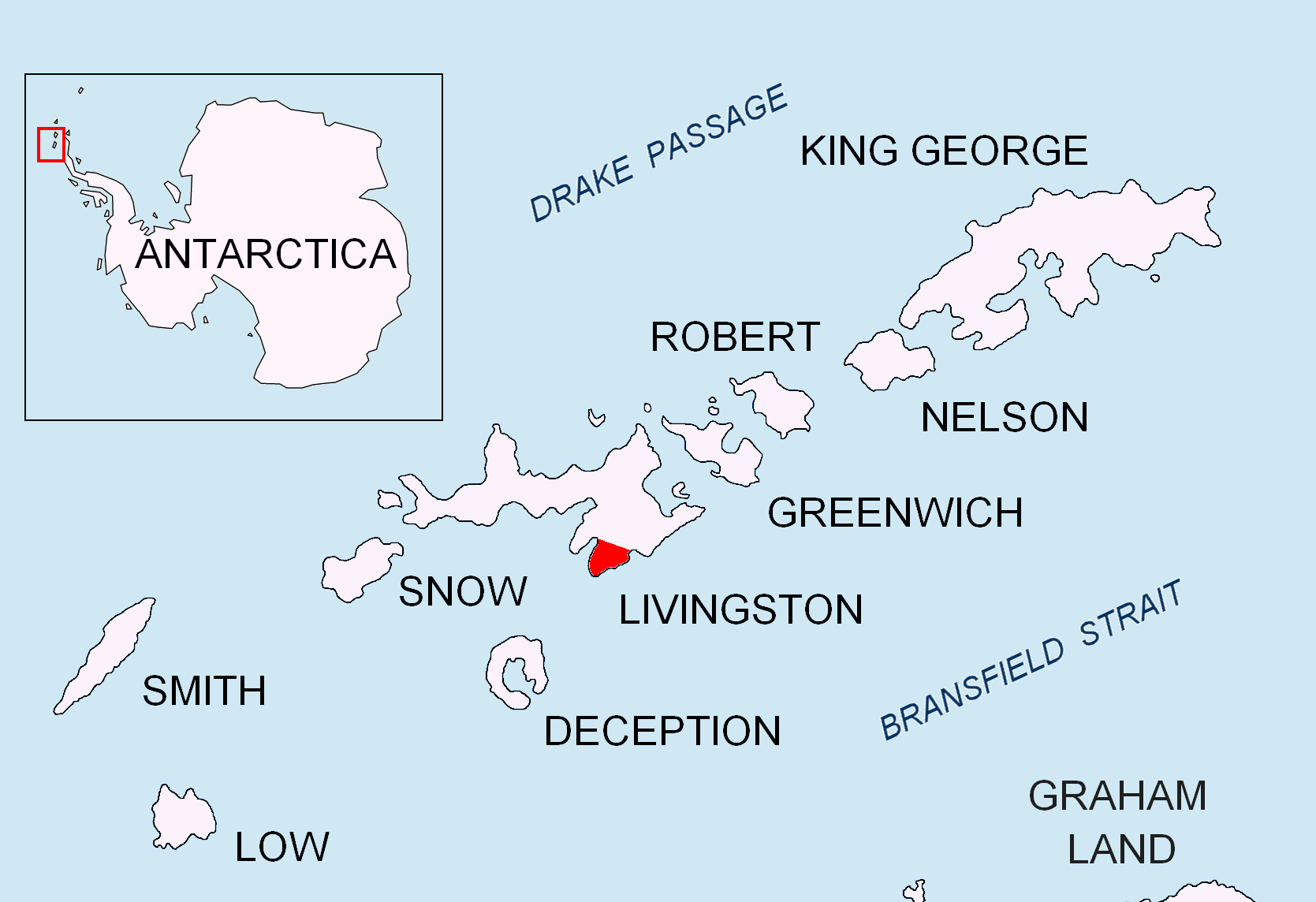
- Location of Rozhen Peninsula on Livingston Island in the South Shetland Islands

- Location within South Shetland Islands Location within Antarctica
- Location: Livingston Island; South Shetland Islands
- Coordinates: 62°43′36″S 60°12′42″W
- Length: 2 nautical miles (3.7 km; 2.3 mi)
- Width: 1.3 nautical miles (2.4 km; 1.5 mi)
- Thickness: unknown
- Terminus: Bransfield Strait
- Status: unknown

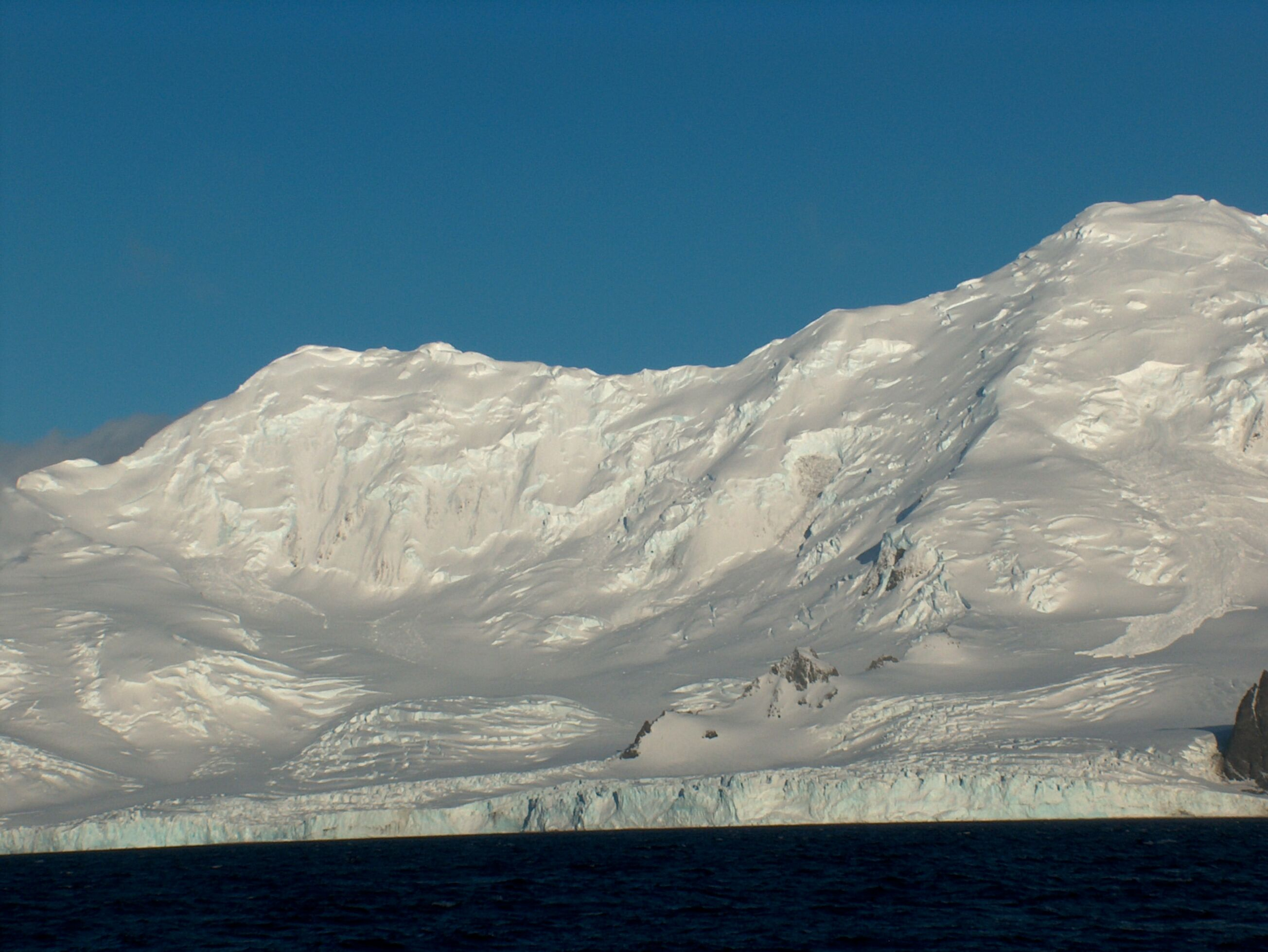
Prespa Glacier from Bransfield Strait, with St. Methodius Peak and St. Cyril Peak in the background.

Topographic map of Livingston Island and Smith Island

Prespa Glacier (Bulgarian: ледник Преспа, romanized: lednik Prespa, IPA: [ˈlɛdnik ˈprɛspɐ]) on Rozhen Peninsula, Livingston Island in the South Shetland Islands, Antarctica is situated east-northeast of Tarnovo Ice Piedmont, east of the head of Charity Glacier, southeast of Ruen Icefall and southwest of Macy Glacier.

It is bounded to the east by Needle Peak and Ludogorie Peak, to the northwest by St. Cyril Peak and St. Methodius Peak, and to the southwest by Shumen Peak and Yambol Peak, and flows southeastward into Bransfield Strait between Gela Point and Samuel Point. The feature extends 3.5 km in east-west direction and 2.5 km in north-south direction.

The glacier is named after Prespa Peak in the Rhodope Mountains, Bulgaria.

== Location ==
Prespa Glacier is centred at 62°43′36″S 60°12′42″W (British mapping in 1968, and Bulgarian in 2005 and 2009).

== See also ==
- List of glaciers in the Antarctic
- Glaciology

== Maps ==
- South Shetland Islands. Scale 1:200000 topographic map. DOS 610 Sheet W 62 60. Tolworth, UK, 1968.
- Islas Livingston y Decepción. Mapa topográfico a escala 1:100000. Madrid: Servicio Geográfico del Ejército, 1991.
- S. Soccol, D. Gildea and J. Bath. Livingston Island, Antarctica. Scale 1:100000 satellite map. The Omega Foundation, USA, 2004.
- L.L. Ivanov et al., Antarctica: Livingston Island and Greenwich Island, South Shetland Islands (from English Strait to Morton Strait, with illustrations and ice-cover distribution), 1:100000 scale topographic map, Antarctic Place-names Commission of Bulgaria, Sofia, 2005
- L.L. Ivanov. Antarctica: Livingston Island and Greenwich, Robert, Snow and Smith Islands. Scale 1:120000 topographic map. Troyan: Manfred Wörner Foundation, 2010. ISBN 978-954-92032-9-5 (First edition 2009. ISBN 978-954-92032-6-4)
- Antarctic Digital Database (ADD). Scale 1:250000 topographic map of Antarctica. Scientific Committee on Antarctic Research (SCAR), 1993–2016.
