= St. Cyril Peak =

1,505m peak in the South Shetland Islands, Antarctica

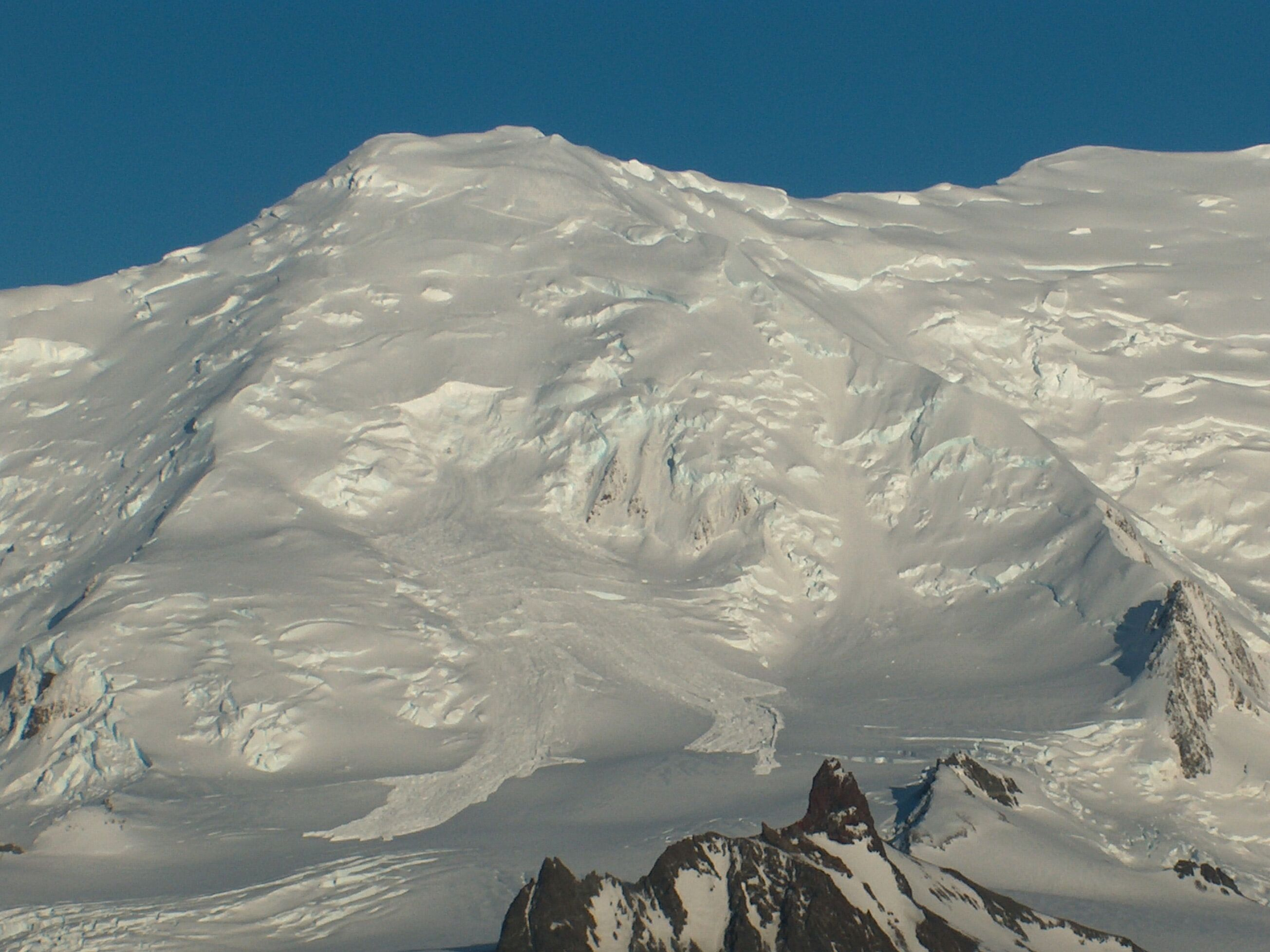
- St. Cyril Peak from Bransfield Strait, with Needle Peak in the foreground.

Highest point
- Elevation: 1,505 m (4,938 ft)

Geography
- Location: Livingston Island, South Shetland Islands, Antarctica
- Parent range: Tangra Mountains

Climbing
- First ascent: unclimbed

Location of Tangra Mountains on Livingston Island in the South Shetland Islands.

Topographic map of Livingston Island, Greenwich, Robert, Snow and Smith Islands.

St. Cyril Peak (Bulgarian: връх Св. Кирил, romanized: vrah Sv. Kiril, IPA: [ˈvrɤx svɛˈti ˈkiriɫ]) rises to 1,505m in Friesland Ridge in Tangra Mountains on Livingston Island in the South Shetland Islands, Antarctica. The peak is linked to St. Methodius Peak to the southwest by Vladaya Saddle and surmounts Ruen Icefall to the west, Macy Glacier to the east and Prespa Glacier to the south.

The peak is "named after St. Cyril (827-869 AD) who, together with St. Methodius, created the Glagolitic alphabet and translated the Holy Books into Bulgarian language".

== Location ==
The peak is located at 62°42′20″S 60°12′50″W, which is 4.15 km south-southwest of Mount Friesland, 1.69 km south of Simeon Peak, 4.27 km northwest of Samuel Point, 1.97 km northeast of St. Methodius Peak and 6.79 km southeast of Napier Peak (Bulgarian topographic survey in 1995/96, and mapping in 2005 and 2009).

== Maps ==
- South Shetland Islands. Scale 1:200000 topographic map. DOS 610 Sheet W 62 60. Tolworth, UK, 1968.
- Islas Livingston y Decepción. Mapa topográfico a escala 1:100000. Madrid: Servicio Geográfico del Ejército, 1991.
- S. Soccol, D. Gildea and J. Bath. Livingston Island, Antarctica. Scale 1:100000 satellite map. The Omega Foundation, USA, 2004.
- L.L. Ivanov et al., Antarctica: Livingston Island and Greenwich Island, South Shetland Islands (from English Strait to Morton Strait, with illustrations and ice-cover distribution), 1:100000 scale topographic map, Antarctic Place-names Commission of Bulgaria, Sofia, 2005
- L.L. Ivanov. Antarctica: Livingston Island and Greenwich, Robert, Snow and Smith Islands. Scale 1:120000 topographic map. Troyan: Manfred Wörner Foundation, 2010. ISBN 978-954-92032-9-5 (First edition 2009. ISBN 978-954-92032-6-4)
- Antarctic Digital Database (ADD). Scale 1:250000 topographic map of Antarctica. Scientific Committee on Antarctic Research (SCAR), 1993–2016.
