= Bogutevo =

Bogutevo Богутево
- Location of Bogutevo in Bulgaria
- Coordinates: 41°43′30″N 24°41′1″E
- Country: Bulgaria
- Provinces (Oblast): Smolyan

Government
  - Mayor (Kmet): S. Terziyski
- Elevation: 1,390 m (4,560 ft)

Population (2010-03-15)
  - Total: 236
- Time zone: UTC+2 (EET)
  - Summer (DST): UTC+3 (EEST)
- Postal Code: 4855
- Area code: 03051

Bogutevo is a village in South Bulgaria. It is part of Chepelare Municipality in Smolyan Province. The village can be reached via the country road 86 and is situated around 75 km south of Plovdiv and 25 km north of Smolyan.

== Geography ==
The village of Bogutevo is in the Rhodope Mountains at the upper reaches of Chepelare river. The climate is temperate continental with an average annual temperature of around 5 °C.

== History ==
Bogutevo is one of the oldest villages in Chepelare Municipality. Its inhabitants took part in the Pomak uprising against the Bulgarian and Russian forces in 1878. Between 1879 and 1895 more than 150 resident Pomaks of the village have been forcibly displaced by Bulgarian military in Anatolia. Due to ongoing persecution and attempts to violently convert the Pomaks from Islam to Christianity using the situation during the Balkan wars, between 1913 and 1914 two-thirds of the Bogutevo population emigrated to Turkey. Until 1923 most of the emigrant families have voluntarily returned to their homes in Bogutevo.

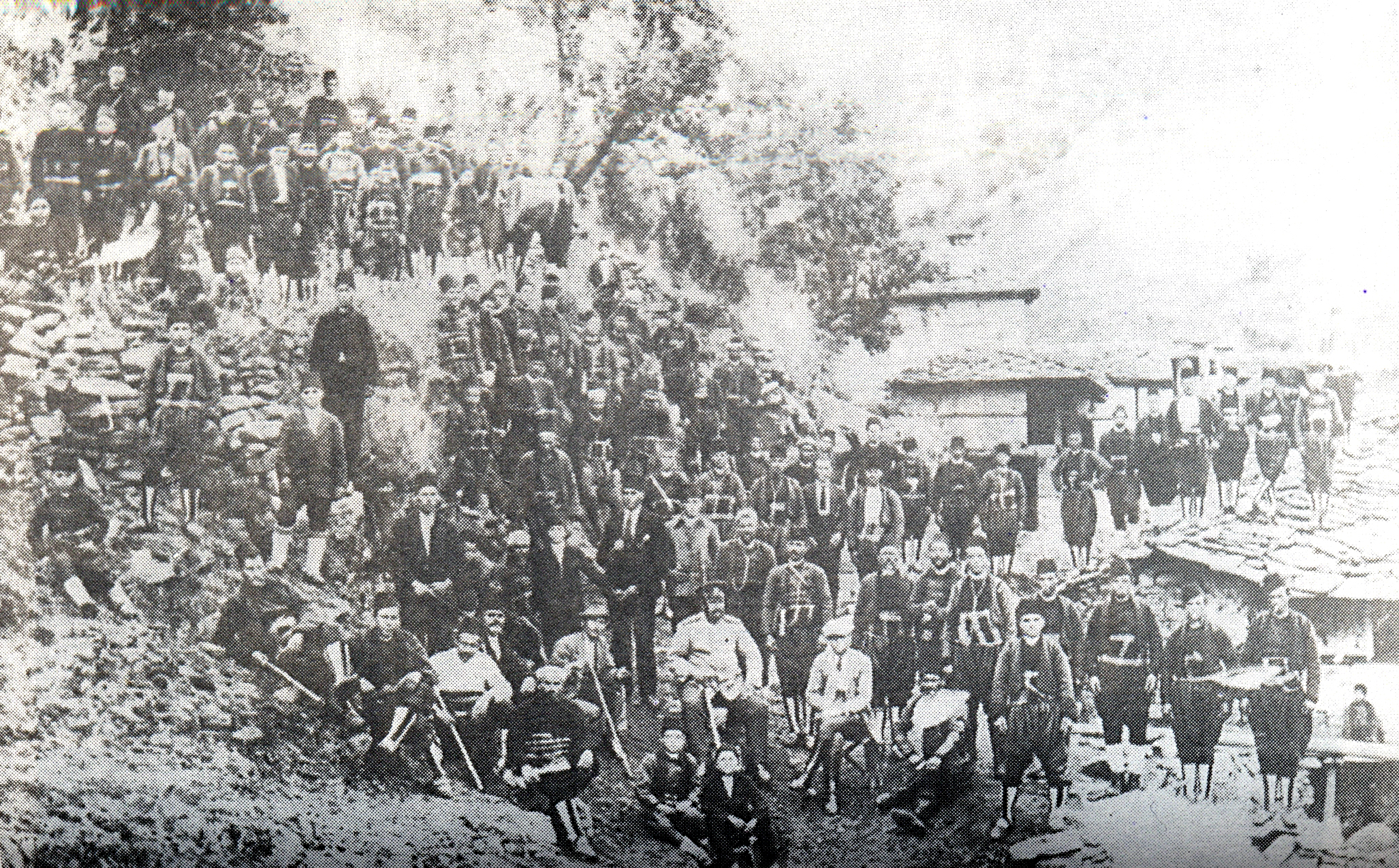
Return of Bogutevo villagers in 1922 from Turkey

According to the census, in 1910 in Bogutevo lived 688 inhabitants Pomaks. After the violences of the Balkan wars, in 1920 in Bogutevo lived barely 198 inhabitants.

In a letter-complaint to the Chairperson of Bulgaria's National Assembly dating from February 4, 1913, the population from the villages Bogutevo, Dryanovo and Er Kyupria wrote: "Mr. Chairman Danov, … We are Bulgarian Muslims from … Stanimaka region. The terror, the abuses, and the sword upon us are in their peak--to make us Christians. This, we believe, our holy Constitution will not allow - to be humiliated, beaten, and threatened to give up our religion … . We live in Old, free Bulgaria, where order, legality and justice reigns, but is it so these days? If you, with angel’s power, could only come and see and hear the tears and sobs of us, the unprotected, you would realise that the conversion is not voluntary, but achieved through great violence. It is a fact, known by the entire world, that if we did want, we would have become Christians 35 years ago when Russia came, not now when we should enjoy our freedom in Great Bulgaria. We trust you and your strong support for us and our suffering, and need to feel that we--we and the entire people--have not been betrayed by those whom we have elected … to govern us.”

== Attractions ==
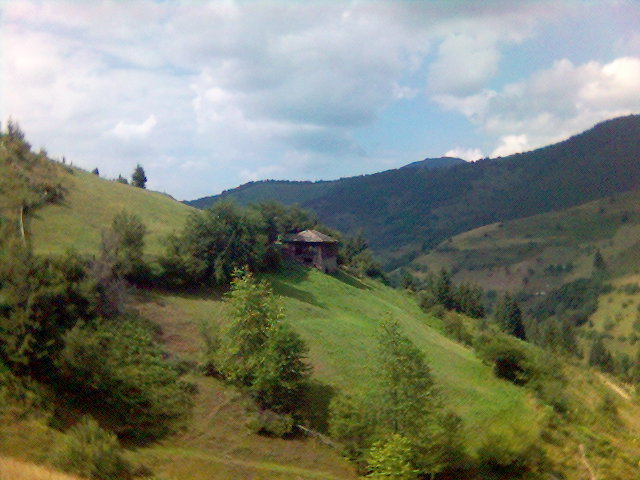
View on the outskirts of the village

Bogutevo is situated in the vicinity of the Pamporovo ski resort and is being increasingly visited by winter tourists. The natural diversity of the Rhodope Mountains combined with the authentic hospitality of the local people makes Bogutevo a preferred destination also during the summer months. The region is culinary well known for its delicious meat and vegetable dishes as well as the traditional "cheverme" (barbecued food) meals. There is an annual traditional congregation of village families on 6 May, which is also visited by people of the neighbouring villages and towns.

== Recent fame ==
Bogutevo has gained attention and was mentioned by the press as a positive example of the USAID programme in 2004 that supported the community development. The initiative has been welcomed by the locals, who have saved and given money themselves to partially help the restoration of their homes and establishment of tourist guest houses.
