= Inepta Cove =

Cove

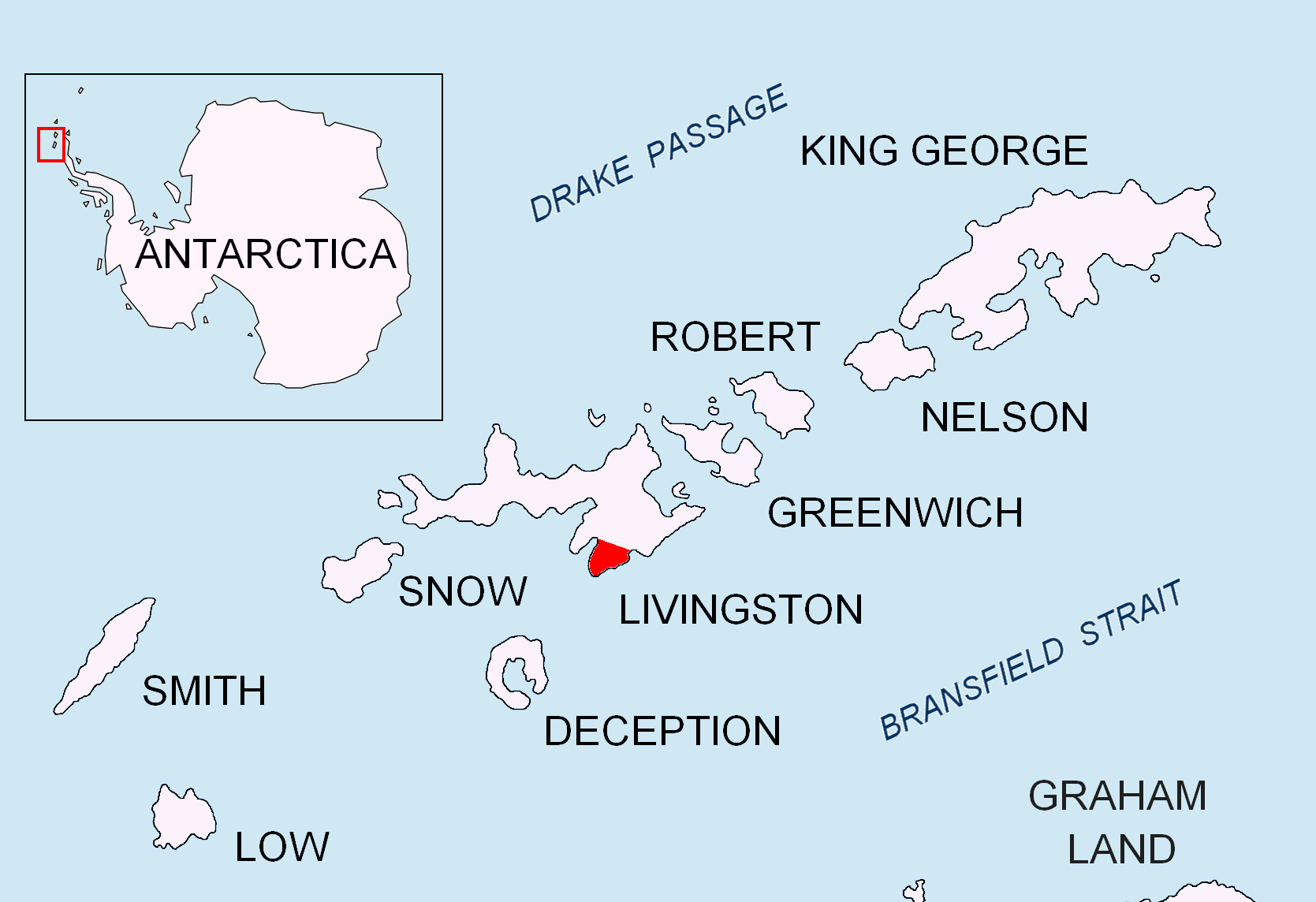
Location of Rozhen Peninsula on Livingston Island in the South Shetland Islands.

Topographic map of Livingston Island.

Inepta Cove (62°42′S 60°18′W) is a cove on the northwest side of Rozhen Peninsula, part of False Bay, Livingston Island in the South Shetland Islands, Antarctica. The feature's configuration has changed markedly, and it has eventually disappeared as a result of the retreat of Huntress Glacier during the last decade of the 20th century and the first decade of the 21st century.

The feature was named "Caleta Inepta" (unapt cove) on a 1954 Argentine navy chart, which reflects the inadequacy of the cove as an anchorage. This name has been approved with an English generic term.

== Maps ==
- L.L. Ivanov et al. Antarctica: Livingston Island and Greenwich Island, South Shetland Islands (from English Strait to Morton Strait, with illustrations and ice-cover distribution). Scale 1:100000 topographic map. Sofia: Antarctic Place-names Commission of Bulgaria, 2005.
- L.L. Ivanov. Antarctica: Livingston Island and Greenwich, Robert, Snow and Smith Islands. Scale 1:120000 topographic map. Troyan: Manfred Wörner Foundation, 2009. ISBN 978-954-92032-6-4
- Antarctic Digital Database (ADD). Scale 1:250000 topographic map of Antarctica. Scientific Committee on Antarctic Research (SCAR). Since 1993, regularly upgraded and updated.
