= MacKay Peak =

Mountain in the South Shetland Islands

Location of Tangra Mountains on Livingston Island in the South Shetland Islands.

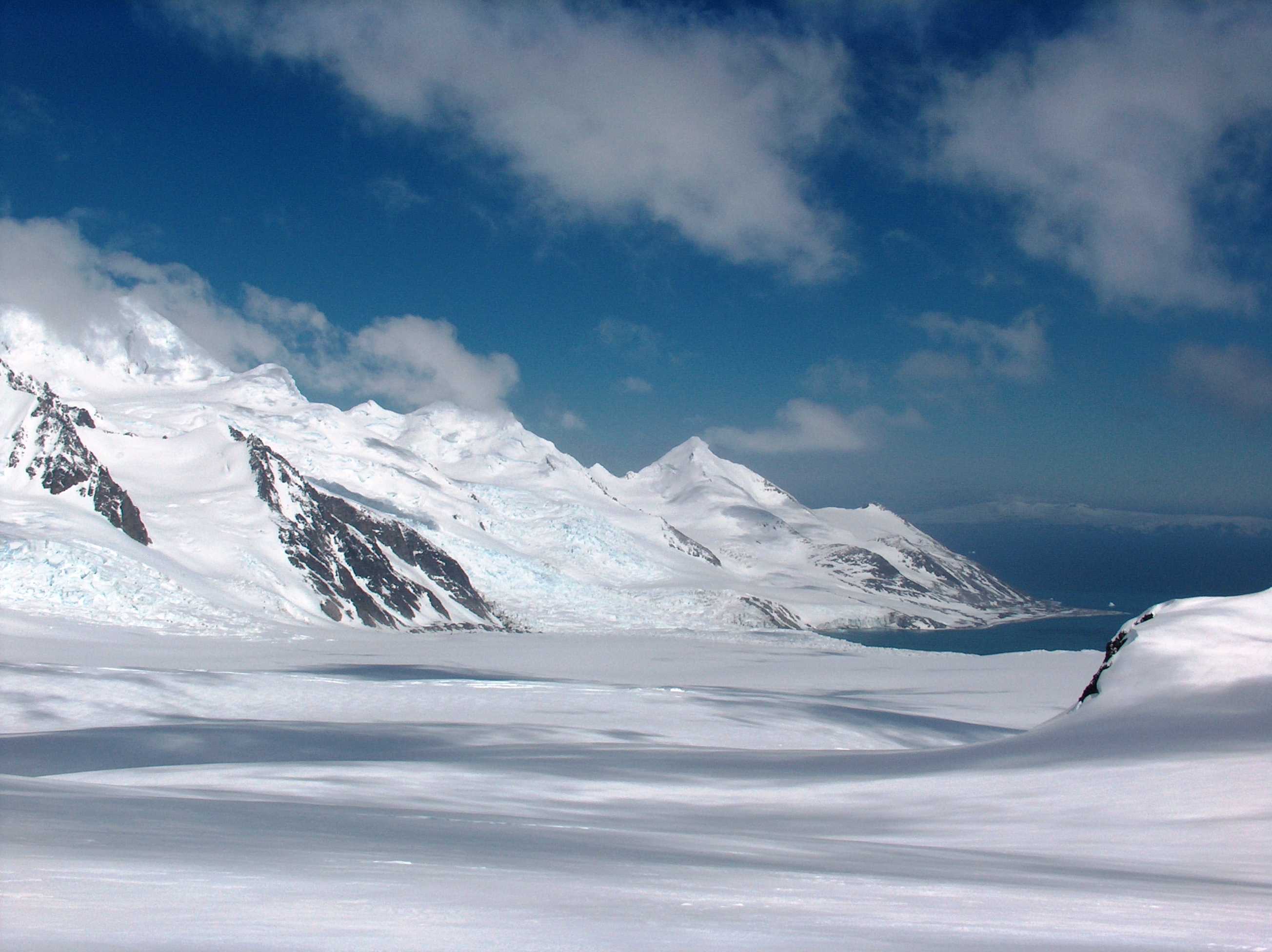
MacKay (the conspicuous sharp peak in the background) from Willan Saddle.

Topographic map of Livingston Island and Smith Island.

MacKay Peak is an ice-covered pyramidal peak rising to 770 m in Friesland Ridge, Tangra Mountains, Livingston Island in the South Shetland Islands, Antarctica. It is linked by Pleven Saddle to Tervel Peak to the east-northeast, and surmounts Peshtera Glacier to the north and Charity Glacier to the south.

The peak is named after Captain Donald MacKay, Master of the American shallop Sarah who, while seal hunting in the islands in 1820–21, sent home a collection of minerals and rocks to the New York Lyceum of Natural History, forerunner of the American Museum of Natural History.

== Location ==
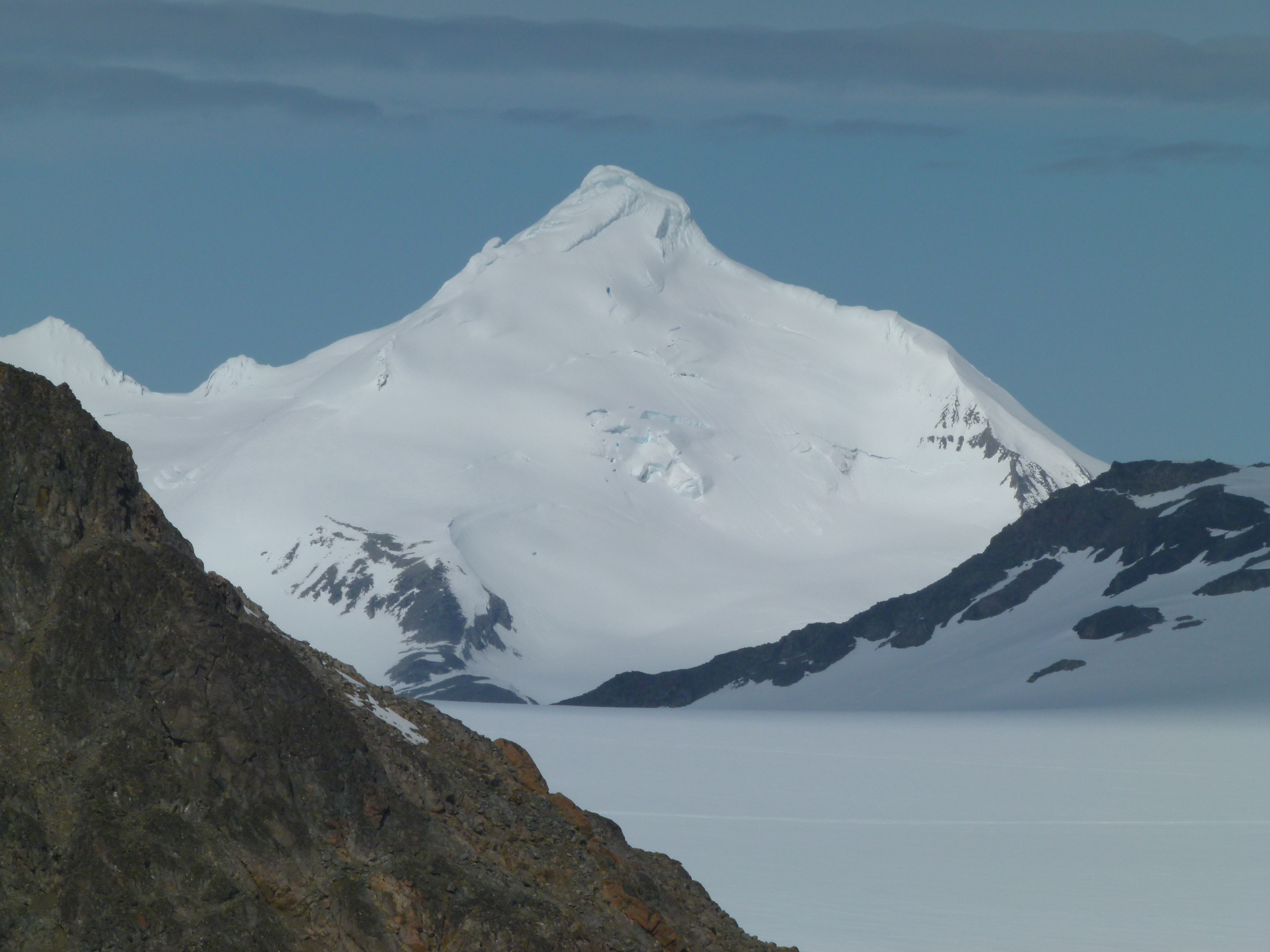
MacKay Peak from Atlantic Club Ridge.

The peak is located at 62°43′16″S 60°17′57.5″W which is 5.67 km south of Napier Peak, 3.62 km southwest of Kikish Crag, 2.76 km west-southwest of St. Methodius Peak and 2.41 km north-northeast of Veleka Peak (British mapping in 1968, and Bulgarian mapping in 2005 and 2009).

== Maps ==
- L.L. Ivanov et al. Antarctica: Livingston Island and Greenwich Island, South Shetland Islands. Scale 1:100000 topographic map. Sofia: Antarctic Place-names Commission of Bulgaria, 2005.
- L.L. Ivanov. Antarctica: Livingston Island and Greenwich, Robert, Snow and Smith Islands. Scale 1:120000 topographic map. Troyan: Manfred Wörner Foundation, 2009. ISBN 978-954-92032-6-4
- L.L. Ivanov. Antarctica: Livingston Island and Smith Island. Scale 1:100000 topographic map. Manfred Wörner Foundation, 2017. ISBN 978-619-90008-3-0
