= Chepelare =

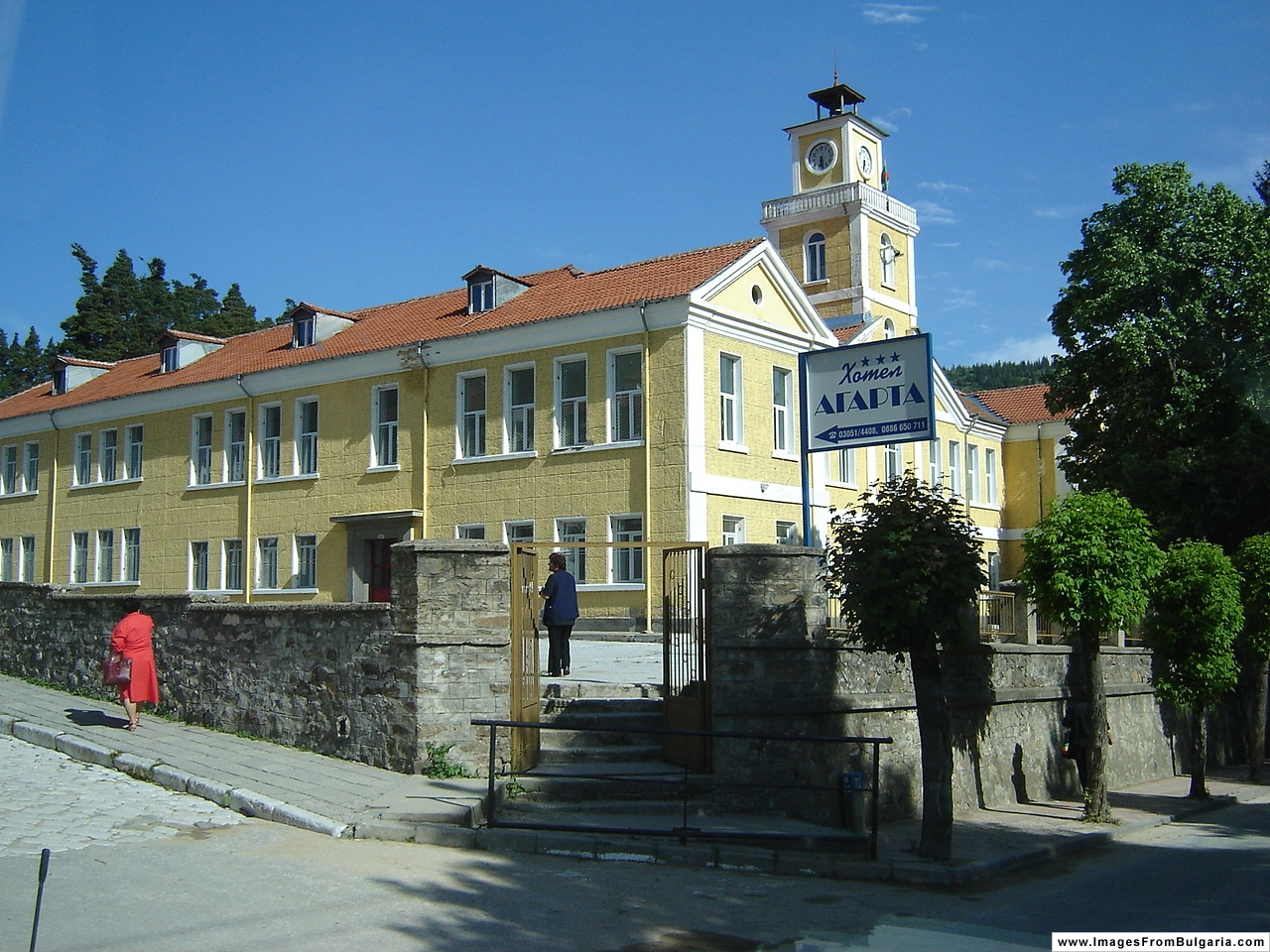
- School in Chepelare

- Location of Chepelare
- Coordinates: 41°43′33″N 24°41′4″E
- Country: Bulgaria
- Provinces (Oblast): Smolyan

Government
  - Mayor: Slavka Chakarova
- Elevation: 1,232 m (4,042 ft)

Population (2009-12-31)
  - Total: 5,412
- Time zone: UTC+2 (EET)
  - Summer (DST): UTC+3 (EEST)
- Postal Code: 4850
- Area code: 03051
- Website: http://www.chepelare.com/

Chepelare (Bulgarian: Чепеларе [tʃɛpɛˈɫarɛ]) is the principal town in Chepelare Municipality, part of Smolyan Province in Southern Bulgaria. It is situated in the central part of the Rhodopes, on the banks of Chepelare River. Chepelare is a popular winter resort with one of the longest ski runs in Southeastern Europe. It is located near Pamporovo, one of the biggest Bulgarian ski resorts. As of December 2009, the town had a population of 5,412.

The town is known for the only ski and snowboard factory in the Balkan Peninsula. The factory cooperates with the ski brand Atomic Skis. Chepelare is also the birthplace of biathlete Ekaterina Dafovska, Bulgaria's only Winter Olympics gold medal winner. The local Sports School provides good conditions for young winter athletes.

Climate table:

Climate data for Chepelare (2000-2013)
Month	Jan	Feb	Mar	Apr	May	Jun	Jul	Aug	Sep	Oct	Nov	Dec	Year
Mean daily maximum °C (°F)	3.2 (37.8)	4.9 (40.8)	8.5 (47.3)	14.3 (57.7)	19.2 (66.6)	22.8 (73.0)	26.3 (79.3)	26.3 (79.3)	21.8 (71.2)	16.3 (61.3)	10.6 (51.1)	5.2 (41.4)	15.0 (59.0)
Daily mean °C (°F)	−1.7 (28.9)	−0.1 (31.8)	2.9 (37.2)	8.5 (47.3)	12.9 (55.2)	16.5 (61.7)	19.3 (66.7)	19.1 (66.4)	14.6 (58.3)	10.0 (50.0)	5.5 (41.9)	0.5 (32.9)	9.0 (48.2)
Mean daily minimum °C (°F)	−6.5 (20.3)	−5.1 (22.8)	−2.7 (27.1)	2.6 (36.7)	6.5 (43.7)	10.1 (50.2)	12.2 (54.0)	11.8 (53.2)	7.3 (45.1)	3.5 (38.3)	0.3 (32.5)	−4.1 (24.6)	3.0 (37.4)
Source: stringmeteo.com

The natural rocky phenomenon Marvelous Bridges is located near Chepelare.

== Honour ==
Chepelare Peak on Livingston Island in the South Shetland Islands, Antarctica is named after Chepelare Town.

== See also ==
- Bogutevo, a village in Chepelare.
