= Nayden Gerov =

Bulgarian linguist, folklorist and writer

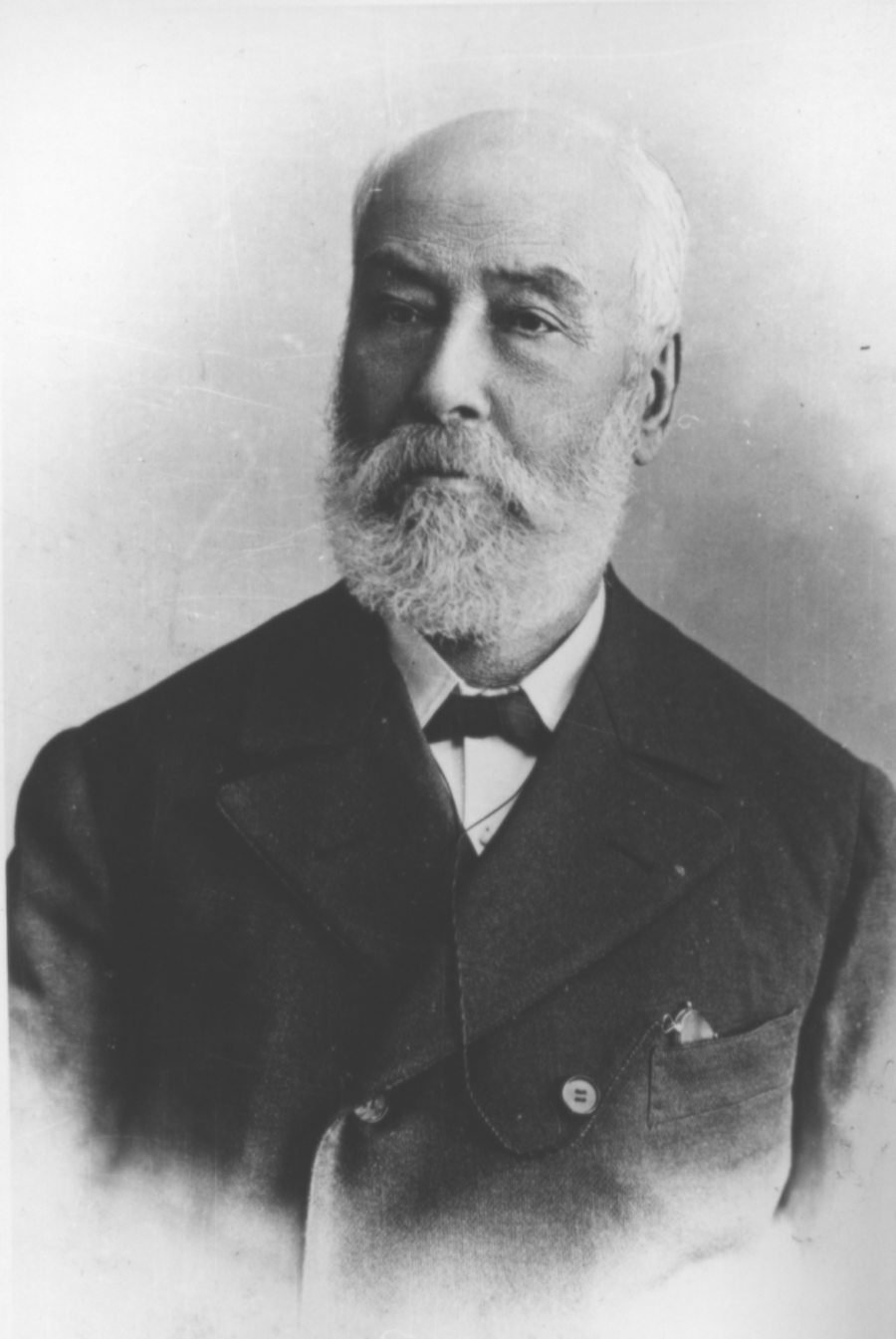
Nayden Gerov

Nayden Gerov (Bulgarian: Найден Геров), born Nayden Gerov Hadzhidobrevich (Bulgarian: Найден Геров Хаджидобревич) February 23, 1823, Koprivshtitsa – October 9, 1900, Plovdiv) was a Bulgarian linguist, folklorist, writer and public figure during the Bulgarian National Revival.

Gerov was the son of Gero Dobrevich, a teacher. He studied at his father's school, then at a Greek school in Plovdiv from 1834 to 1836, again in his hometown until 1839, and finally in Odessa, in the Russian Empire, where he graduated from the Richelieu Lyceum in 1845. Gerov became a Russian subject and came back to Koprivshtitsa, where he established his own school, named after Saints Cyril and Methodius. He became famous for his erudition and was invited to open a gymnasium in Plovdiv as well, an invitation which he accepted.

As a publicist, he fought the "Graecisation" (assimilation to Greek culture) among the Bulgarians of the time, especially in Plovdiv. At the same time, he managed to compete successfully with the Greek gymnasium in Plovdiv. During the Crimean War (1854–56), he was forced to temporarily leave the country as a Russian subject. In 1857, Gerov became "First Vice-Consul" of Russia in Plovdiv. In this capacity, he helped young Bulgarians to receive scholarships abroad.

In contrast to more radical revolutionary emigres who wanted an independent uprising, such as Lyuben Karavelov, Vasil Levski, and Hristo Botev, Gerov preferred to rely on Russia's support in securing Bulgaria's independence from the Ottoman Empire. He was still suspected of having been one of the organizers of the April uprising (1876), which forced him to go into hiding and seek refuge in the Russian legation in Constantinople. After the liberation, he held some administrative offices for a short time, but soon devoted all of his time to philology.

Gerov's principal work was his unique Dictionary of the Bulgarian Language (Рѣчникъ на блъгарскъıй язъıкъ). For about fifty years, he collected, from ordinary people, a great number of words, expressions, proverbs, folk songs, and proper nouns. The first three letters were already published in 1855–1856 in Russia, but the dictionary as a whole was published in five volumes, from 1895 to 1904, with an appendix added in 1908 by Gerov's collaborator T.Panchev. The dictionary contains about 100,000 entries (if the appendix is included). It is considered an extremely valuable source for the study of the Bulgarian language of the 19th century.

Gerov also advocated for an etymologically-based orthography for Bulgarian. His orthography was eventually rejected in favour of the one proposed by Marin Drinov.

Gerov Pass in Tangra Mountains on Livingston Island in the South Shetland Islands, Antarctica is named after Nayden Gerov.

== Works ==
Рѣчникъ на блъгарскъıй язъıкъ съ тлъкувание рѣчъı-тъı на блъгарскъı и на русскъı. Чясть прьва (Dictionary of the Bulgarian Language with interpretation of speeches in Bulgarian and Russian. Part one.)
