= St. Methodius Peak =

Mountain in Livingston Island, South Shetland Islands, Antarctica

Location of Tangra Mountains on Livingston Island in the South Shetland Islands.

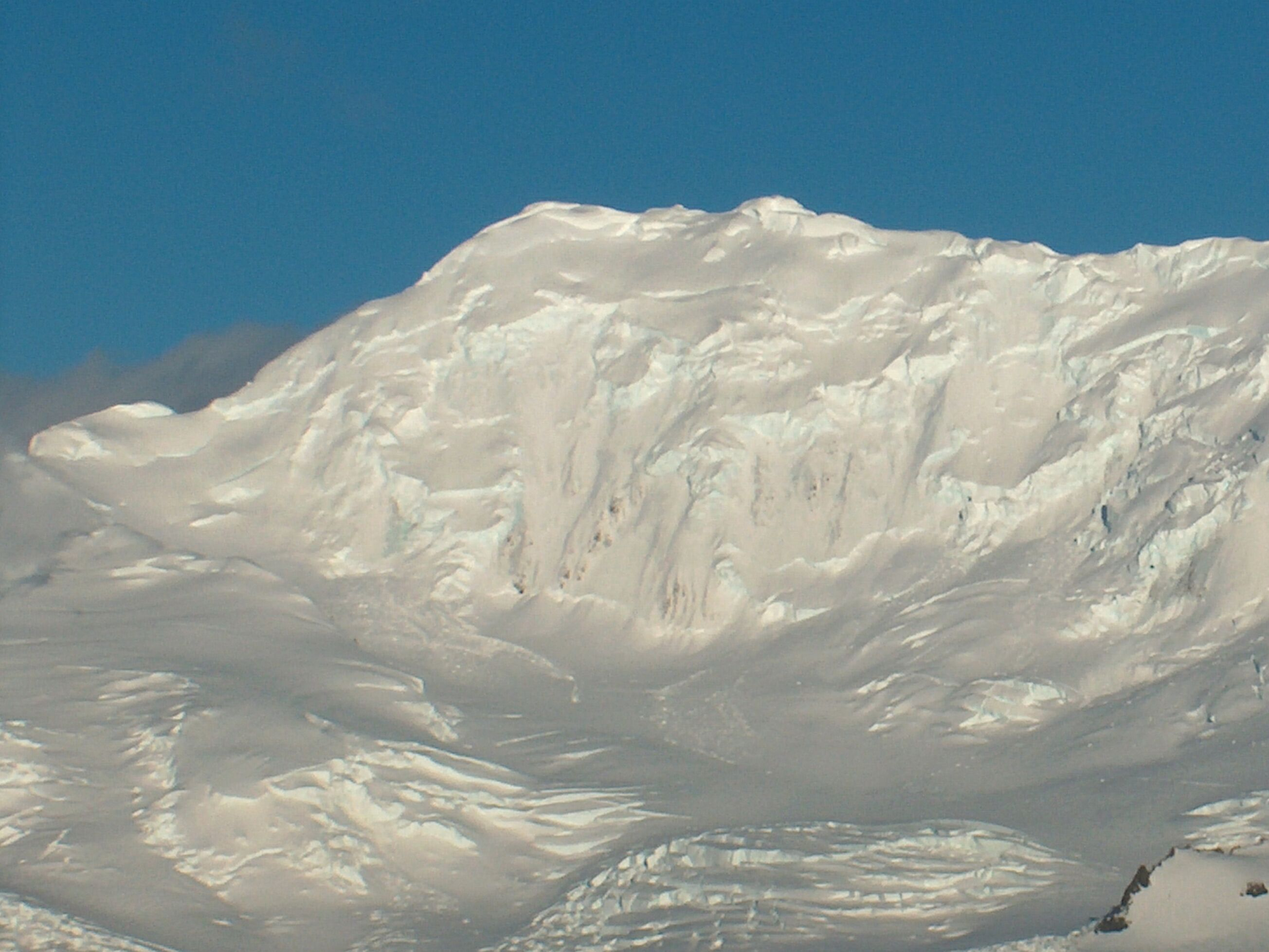
St. Methodius Peak from Bransfield Strait, with Prespa Glacier in the foreground.

Topographic map of Livingston Island, Greenwich, Robert, Snow and Smith Islands.

St. Methodius Peak (Bulgarian: връх Св. Методий, romanized: vrah Sv. Metodiy, IPA: [ˈvrɤx svɛˈti mɛˈtɔdij]) rises to approximately 1,180m in Friesland Ridge, Tangra Mountains, Livingston Island, Antarctica and surmounts Ruen Icefall to the north-northwest, Prespa Glacier to the southeast and Charity Glacier to the southwest. Linked to St. Cyril Peak by Vladaya Saddle.

The peak is named after St. Methodius (815-885 AD).

== Location ==
The peak is located at 62°42′57″S 60°14′47″W, which is 5.89 km south-southwest of Mount Friesland, 1.97 km southwest of St. Cyril Peak, 3.24 km north-northwest of Gela Point, 3.83 km east of Canetti Peak and 6.37 km south-southeast of Napier Peak (Bulgarian topographic survey in 1995/96, and mapping in 2005 and 2009).

== Maps ==
- South Shetland Islands. Scale 1:200000 topographic map. DOS 610 Sheet W 62 60. Tolworth, UK, 1968.
- Islas Livingston y Decepción. Mapa topográfico a escala 1:100000. Madrid: Servicio Geográfico del Ejército, 1991.
- S. Soccol, D. Gildea and J. Bath. Livingston Island, Antarctica. Scale 1:100000 satellite map. The Omega Foundation, USA, 2004.
- L.L. Ivanov et al., Antarctica: Livingston Island and Greenwich Island, South Shetland Islands (from English Strait to Morton Strait, with illustrations and ice-cover distribution), 1:100000 scale topographic map, Antarctic Place-names Commission of Bulgaria, Sofia, 2005
- L.L. Ivanov. Antarctica: Livingston Island and Greenwich, Robert, Snow and Smith Islands. Scale 1:120000 topographic map. Troyan: Manfred Wörner Foundation, 2010. ISBN 978-954-92032-9-5 (First edition 2009. ISBN 978-954-92032-6-4)
- Antarctic Digital Database (ADD). Scale 1:250000 topographic map of Antarctica. Scientific Committee on Antarctic Research (SCAR), 1993–2016.
