= Rozhen Peninsula =

Peninsula in Antarctica

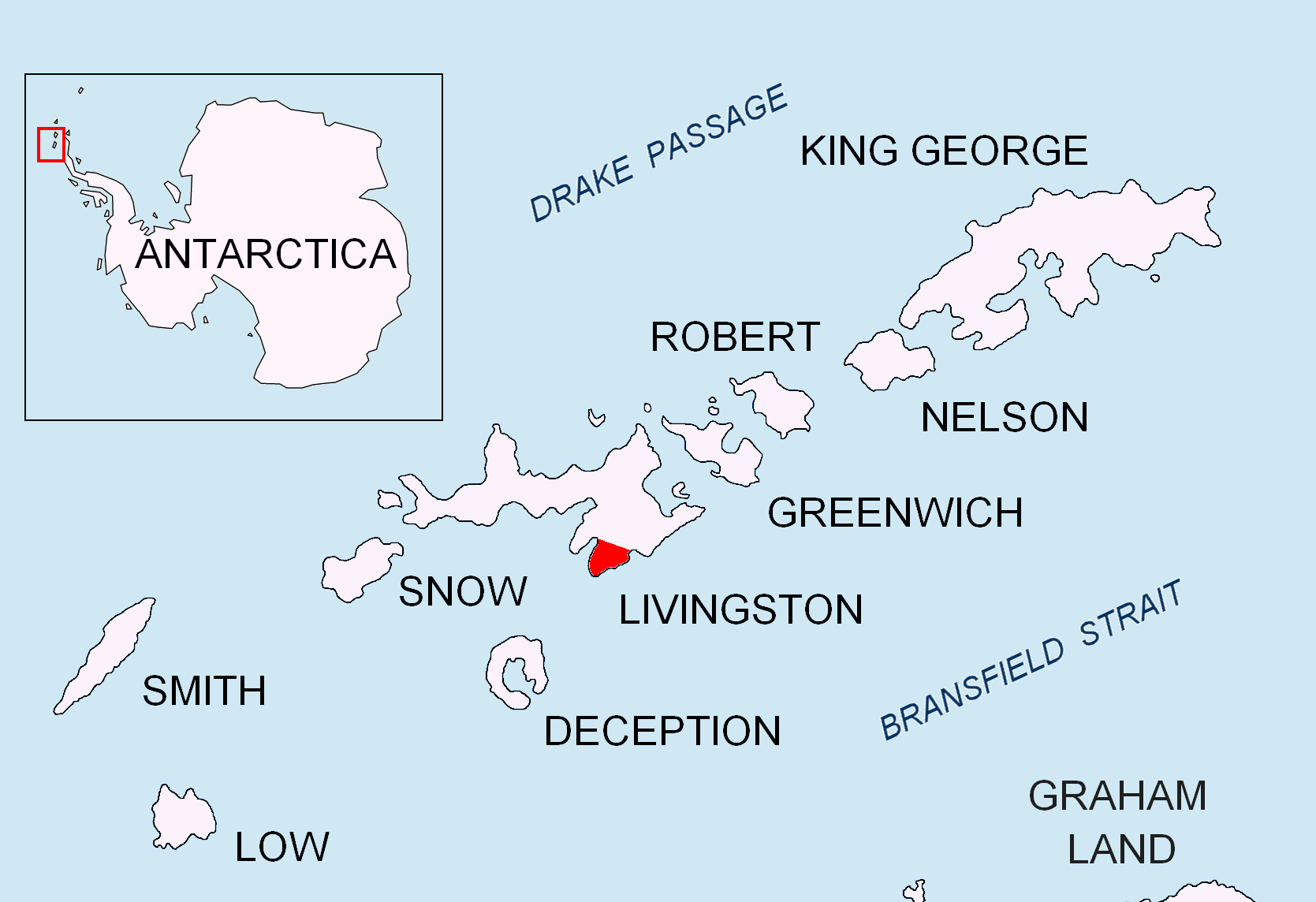
Location of Rozhen Peninsula on Livingston Island in the South Shetland Islands.

Topographic map of Livingston Island.

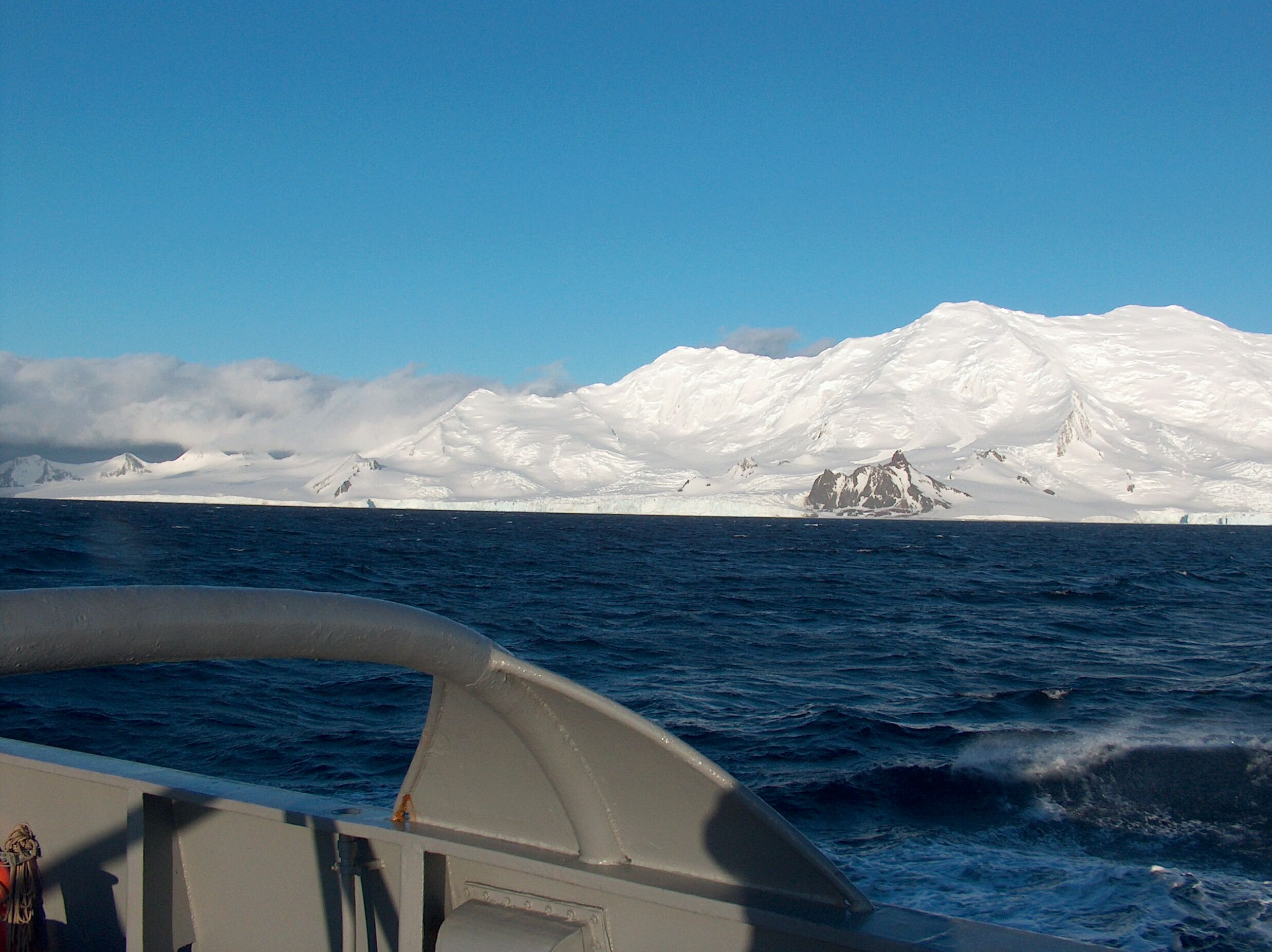
Rozhen Peninsula from Bransfield Strait.

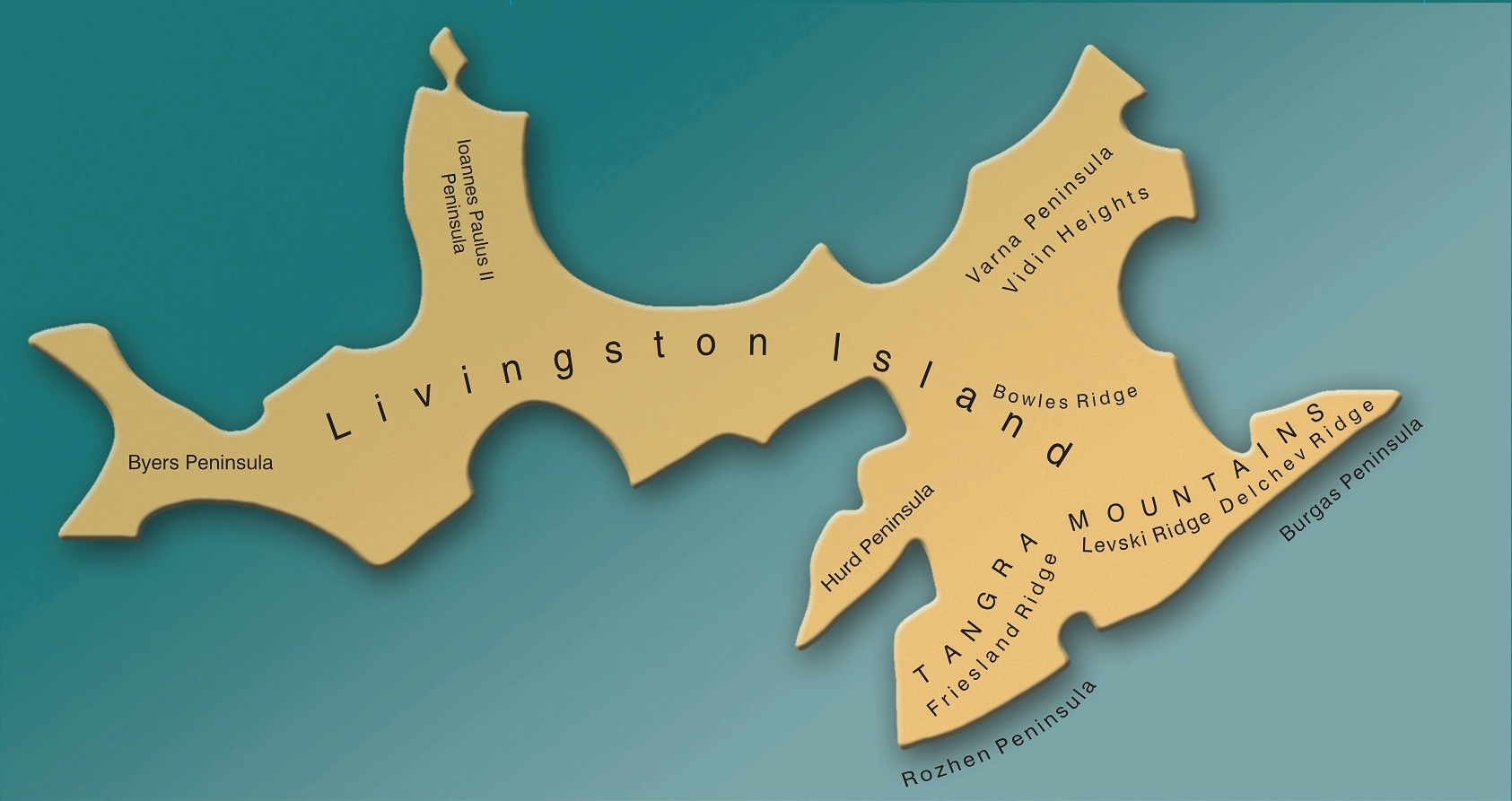
Livingston Island peninsulas.

Rozhen Peninsula (Bulgarian: полуостров Рожен, romanized: poluostrov Rozhen, IPA: [poɫuˈɔstrof ˈrɔʒɛn]) extends 9 km in the southwest direction towards Barnard Point, Livingston Island in the South Shetland Islands, Antarctica, and 8.8 km wide. It is bounded by False Bay and its segment Inept Cove to the west, Bransfield Strait to the southeast and Brunow Bay to the east. Its interior is occupied by the Friesland Ridge of Tangra Mountains.

The peninsula is named after Rozhen site in Pirin Mountain, Bulgaria.

== Location ==
The peninsula is centered at 62°43′00″S 60°15′00″W (UK Directorate of Overseas Surveys mapping in 1968, partial Spanish mapping by the Servicio Geográfico del Ejército in 1991, and Bulgarian mapping in 2005 and 2009 from topographic surveys in 1995/96 and Tangra 2004/05).

== See also ==
- Friesland Ridge
- Livingston Island

== Maps ==
- L.L. Ivanov et al. Antarctica: Livingston Island and Greenwich Island, South Shetland Islands. Scale 1:100000 topographic map. Sofia: Antarctic Place-names Commission of Bulgaria, 2005.
- L.L. Ivanov. Antarctica: Livingston Island and Greenwich, Robert, Snow and Smith Islands. Scale 1:120000 topographic map. Troyan: Manfred Wörner Foundation, 2010. ISBN 978-954-92032-9-5 (First edition 2009. ISBN 978-954-92032-6-4)
- Antarctic Digital Database (ADD). Scale 1:250000 topographic map of Antarctica. Scientific Committee on Antarctic Research (SCAR). Since 1993, regularly upgraded and updated.
- L.L. Ivanov. Antarctica: Livingston Island and Smith Island. Scale 1:100000 topographic map. Manfred Wörner Foundation, 2017. ISBN 978-619-90008-3-0
