= Charity Glacier =

Glacier in Antarctica

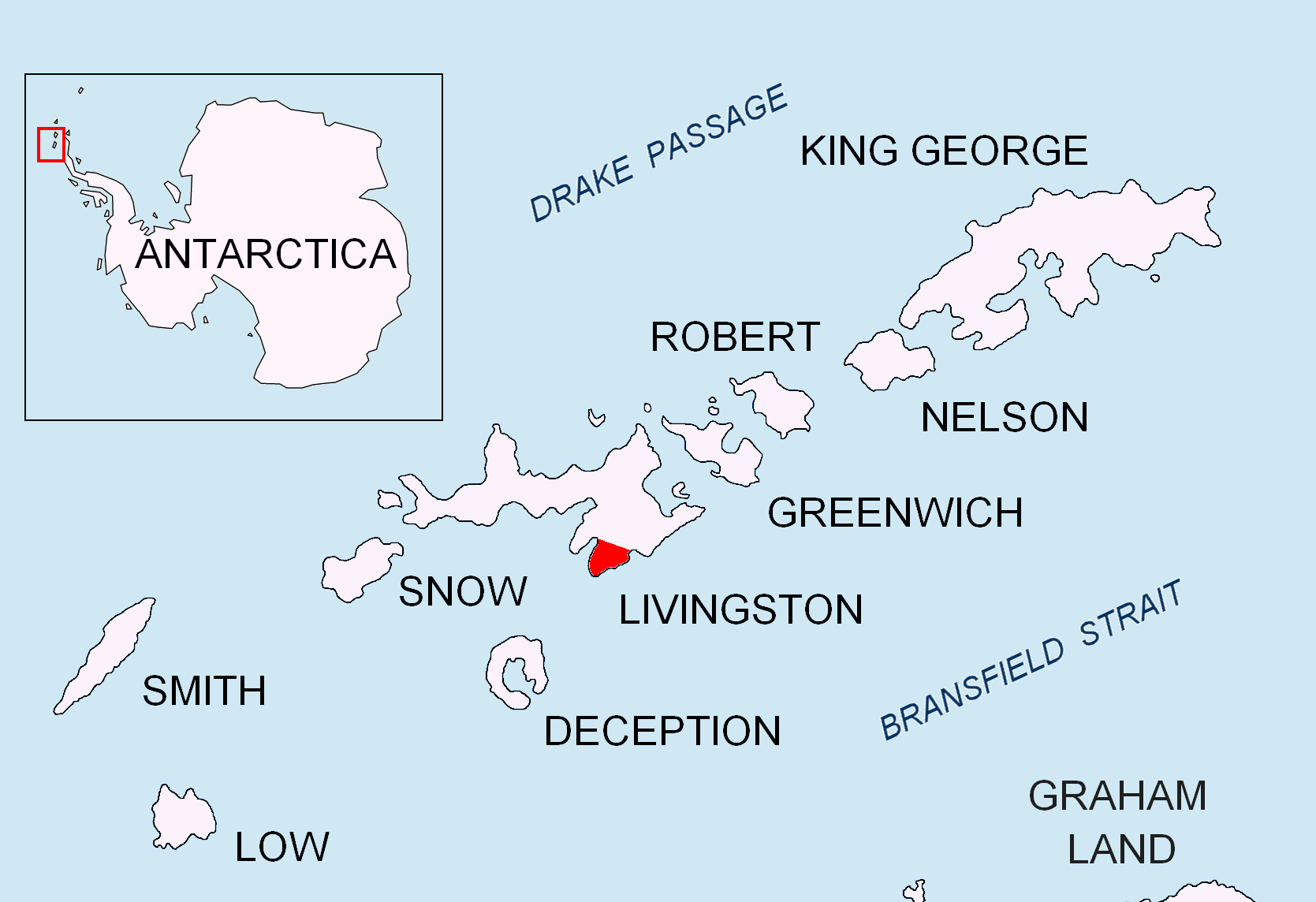
- Location of Rozhen Peninsula on Livingston Island in the South Shetland Islands

- Location within South Shetland Islands Location within Antarctica
- Location: Livingston Island; South Shetland Islands
- Coordinates: 62°44′00″S 60°20′00″W
- Thickness: unknown
- Terminus: False Bay
- Status: unknown

Topographic map of Livingston Island and Smith Island

Charity Glacier (62°44′S 60°20′W) is a glacier on Rozhen Peninsula, Livingston Island in the South Shetland Islands, Antarctica draining the southwest slopes of St. Methodius Peak in Tangra Mountains, and flowing west-southwestwards into False Bay north of Barnard Point, between Zagore Beach and Arkutino Beach.

The glacier was named by the UK Antarctic Place-names Committee in 1958 after the brig Charity (Capt. Charles H. Barnard), one of a fleet of American sealers from New York which visited the South Shetland Islands in 1820–21, operating mainly from Yankee Harbor, Greenwich Island. The Charity also visited the islands the following season.

== See also ==
- List of glaciers in the Antarctic
- Glaciology

== Map ==
- L.L. Ivanov et al., Antarctica: Livingston Island and Greenwich Island, South Shetland Islands (from English Strait to Morton Strait, with illustrations and ice-cover distribution), 1:100000 scale topographic map, Antarctic Place-names Commission of Bulgaria, Sofia, 2005
- L.L. Ivanov. Antarctica: Livingston Island and Greenwich, Robert, Snow and Smith Islands. Scale 1:120000 topographic map. Troyan: Manfred Wörner Foundation, 2009. ISBN 978-954-92032-6-4
