= Friesland Ridge =

Ridge on Livingston Island, South Shetlands, Antarctica

Location of Tangra Mountains on Livingston Island in the South Shetland Islands.

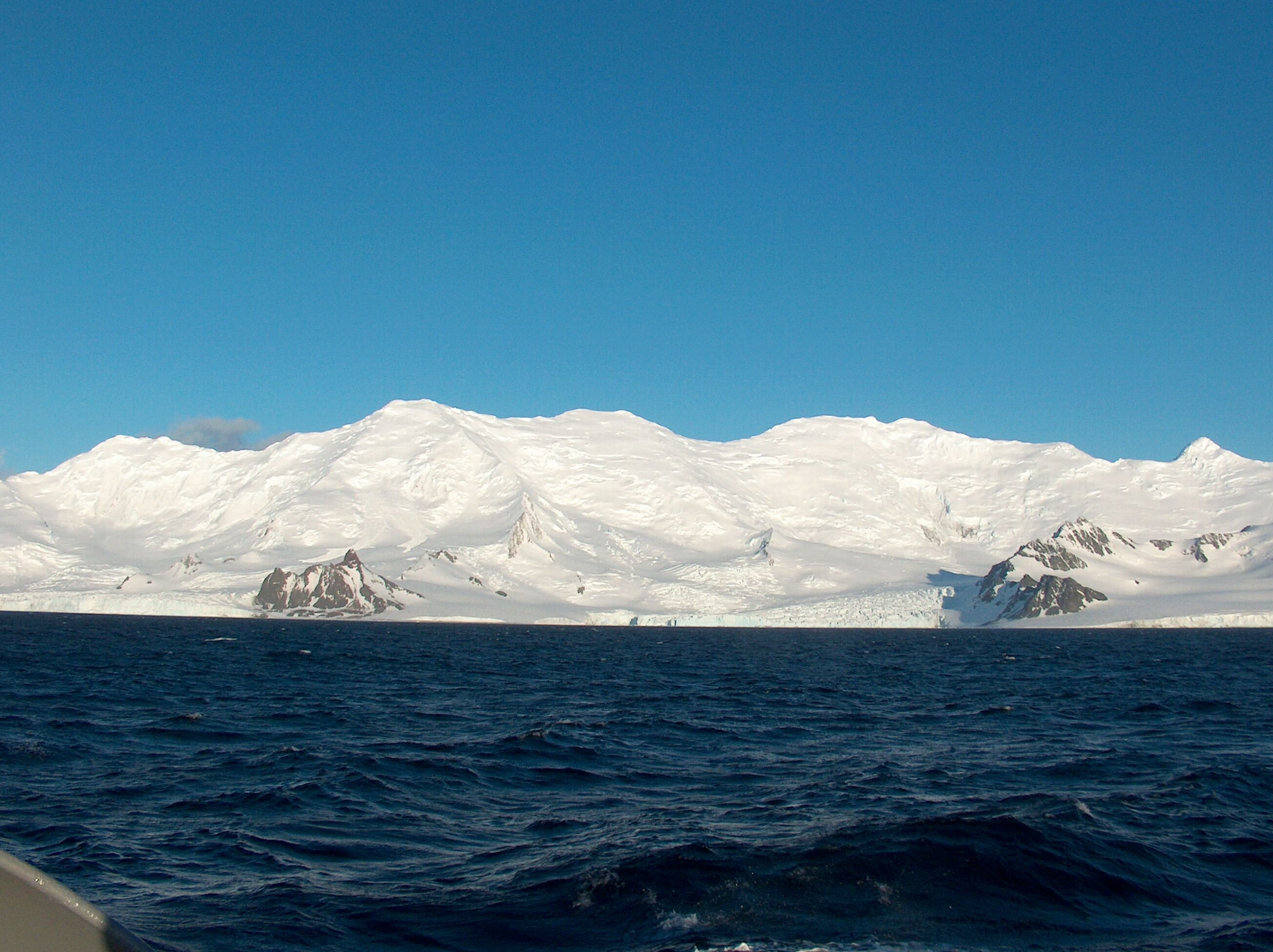
Friesland Ridge from Bransfield Strait, with left to right St. Methodius Peak, St. Cyril Peak, Simeon Peak, St. Boris Peak with The Synagogue, Mount Friesland and Lyaskovets Peak in the background, and Needle Peak, Macy Glacier and Peshev Ridge in the foreground.

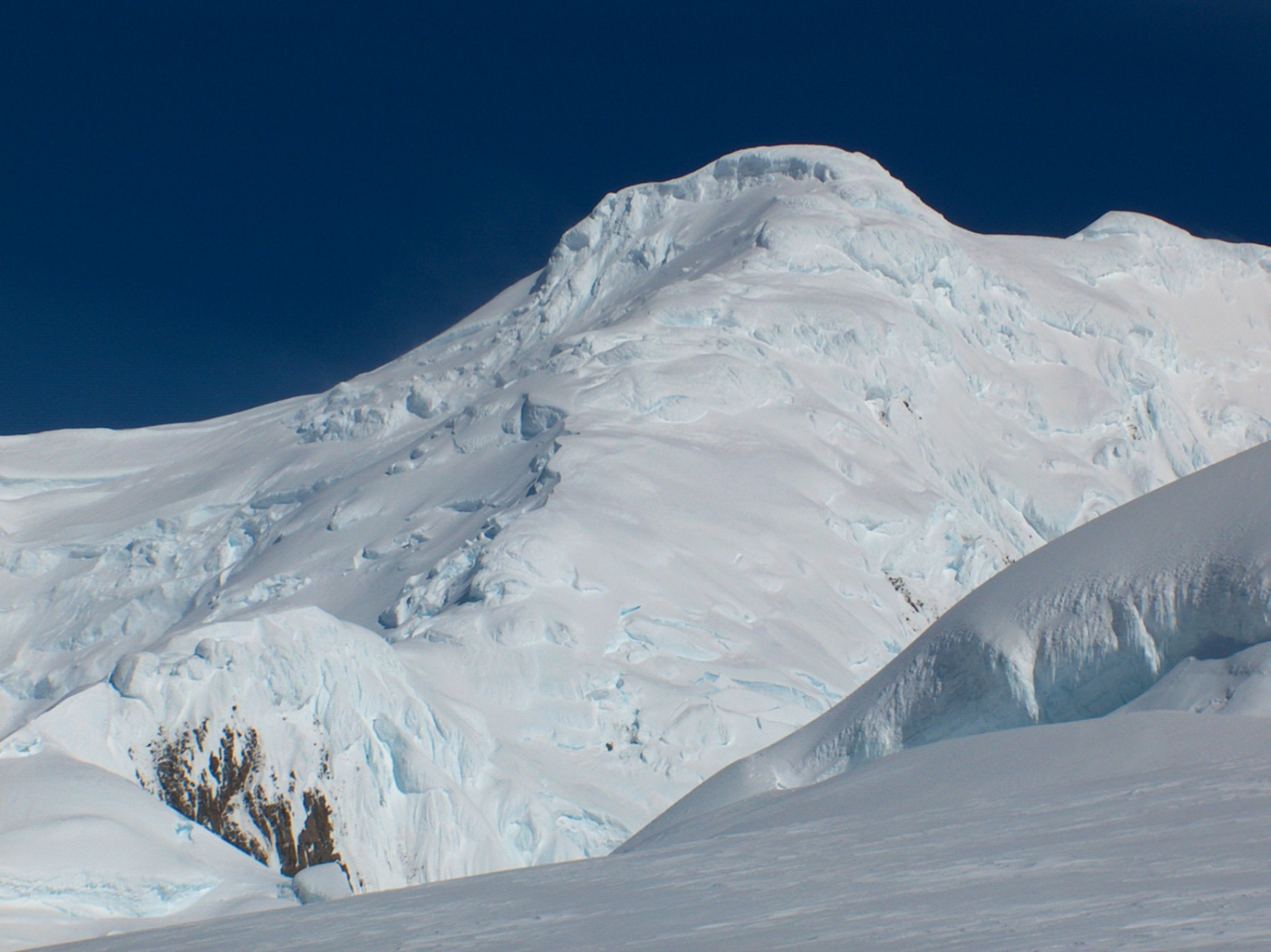
Mount Friesland from Perunika Glacier.

Topographic map of Livingston Island and Smith Island.

Friesland Ridge (Hrebet Frisland \'hre-bet 'fris-land\) is a ridge on Livingston Island in the South Shetlands, part of the Tangra Mountains. The summit, Mount Friesland, which rises to 1,700 metres (5,600 ft), is the northwesternmost of the ridge's six main peaks. Its elevation was estimated at 1,684 metres (5,525 ft) by a 1995/96 Bulgarian survey; the present figure was produced by a 2003 Australian GPS survey, and closely matched (as 1,702 metres (5,584 ft)) by the Bulgarian survey Tangra 2004/05.

The local ice relief is subject to changes, causing variations in the mountain peaks’ elevation. According to a Bulgarian GPS survey by D. Boyanov and N. Petkov the elevation of Mt. Friesland was 1,693 metres (5,554 ft) in December 2016, making the peak lower than the adjacent St. Boris Peak (the latter's northernmost ice formation ‘The Synagogue’ rising to 1,699 metres (5,574 ft)) at that time.

First ascent of the summit Mount Friesland by the Catalans Francesc Sàbat and Jorge Enrique from Juan Carlos I Base on 30 December 1991.

The feature takes its name from Mount Friesland.

== Location ==
The midpoint of the ridge is located at 62°42′15″S 60°13′30″W (UK Directorate of Overseas Surveys mapping in 1968, partial mapping by the Spanish Servicio Geográfico del Ejército in 1991, and Bulgarian mapping in 2005 from topographic surveys in 1995/96 and 2004/05).

== Maps ==
- L.L. Ivanov. Livingston Island: Central-Eastern Region. Scale 1:25000 topographic map. Sofia: Antarctic Place-names Commission of Bulgaria, 1996.
- S. Soccol, D. Gildea and J. Bath. Livingston Island, Antarctica. Scale 1:100000 satellite map. The Omega Foundation, USA, 2004.
- L.L. Ivanov et al. Antarctica: Livingston Island and Greenwich Island, South Shetland Islands. Scale 1:100000 topographic map. Sofia: Antarctic Place-names Commission of Bulgaria, 2005.
- L.L. Ivanov. Antarctica: Livingston Island and Greenwich, Robert, Snow and Smith Islands. Scale 1:120000 topographic map. Troyan: Manfred Wörner Foundation, 2009. ISBN 978-954-92032-6-4
- L.L. Ivanov. Antarctica: Livingston Island and Smith Island. Scale 1:100000 topographic map. Manfred Wörner Foundation, 2017. ISBN 978-619-90008-3-0
- A. Kamburov and L. Ivanov. Bowles Ridge and Central Tangra Mountains: Livingston Island, Antarctica. Scale 1:25000 map. Sofia: Manfred Wörner Foundation, 2023. ISBN 978-619-90008-6-1
