= Radomir Knoll =

Location of Tangra Mountains on Livingston Island in the South Shetland Islands.

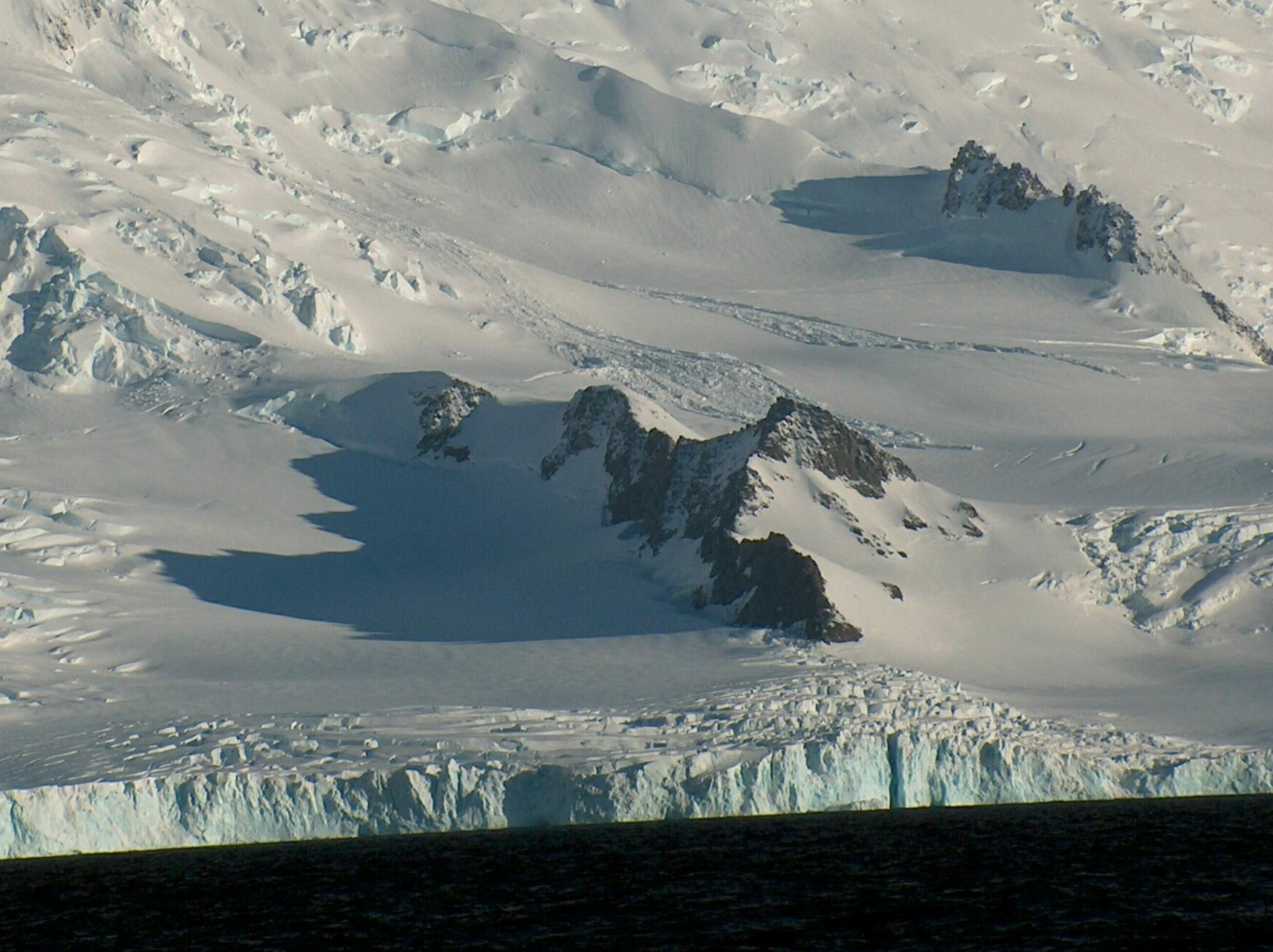
Radomir Knoll from Bransfield Strait, with Prespa Glacier in the foreground and Preslav Crag in the background.

Topographic map of Livingston Island and Smith Island.

Radomir Knoll (Radomirska Mogila \'ra-do-mir-ska mo-'gi-la\) rises to approximately 300 m in Prespa Glacier, eastern Livingston Island in the South Shetland Islands, Antarctica. It is formed by the south extremity of an offshoot of Friesland Ridge, Tangra Mountains that extends to the south-southeast from St. Cyril Peak, and surmounts Chavei Cove to the south and southwest.

The feature is named after the Bulgarian town of Radomir.

== Location ==
The knoll is located at 62°43′32.8″S 60°11′43″W, which is 1.55 km west of Needle Peak, 2.46 km south-southeast of St. Cyril Peak, 2.66 km northeast of Yambol Peak and 2.15 km northeast of Gela Point (Bulgarian mapping in 2005 and 2009).

== Maps ==
- L.L. Ivanov et al. Antarctica: Livingston Island and Greenwich Island, South Shetland Islands. Scale 1:100000 topographic map. Sofia: Antarctic Place-names Commission of Bulgaria, 2005.
- L.L. Ivanov. Antarctica: Livingston Island and Greenwich, Robert, Snow and Smith Islands. Scale 1:120000 topographic map. Troyan: Manfred Wörner Foundation, 2009. ISBN 978-954-92032-6-4
- Antarctic Digital Database (ADD). Scale 1:250000 topographic map of Antarctica. Scientific Committee on Antarctic Research (SCAR). Since 1993, regularly upgraded and updated.
- L.L. Ivanov. Antarctica: Livingston Island and Smith Island. Scale 1:100000 topographic map. Manfred Wörner Foundation, 2017. ISBN 978-619-90008-3-0
