= Botev Peak, Livingston Island =

Location of Tangra Mountains on Livingston Island in the South Shetland Islands.

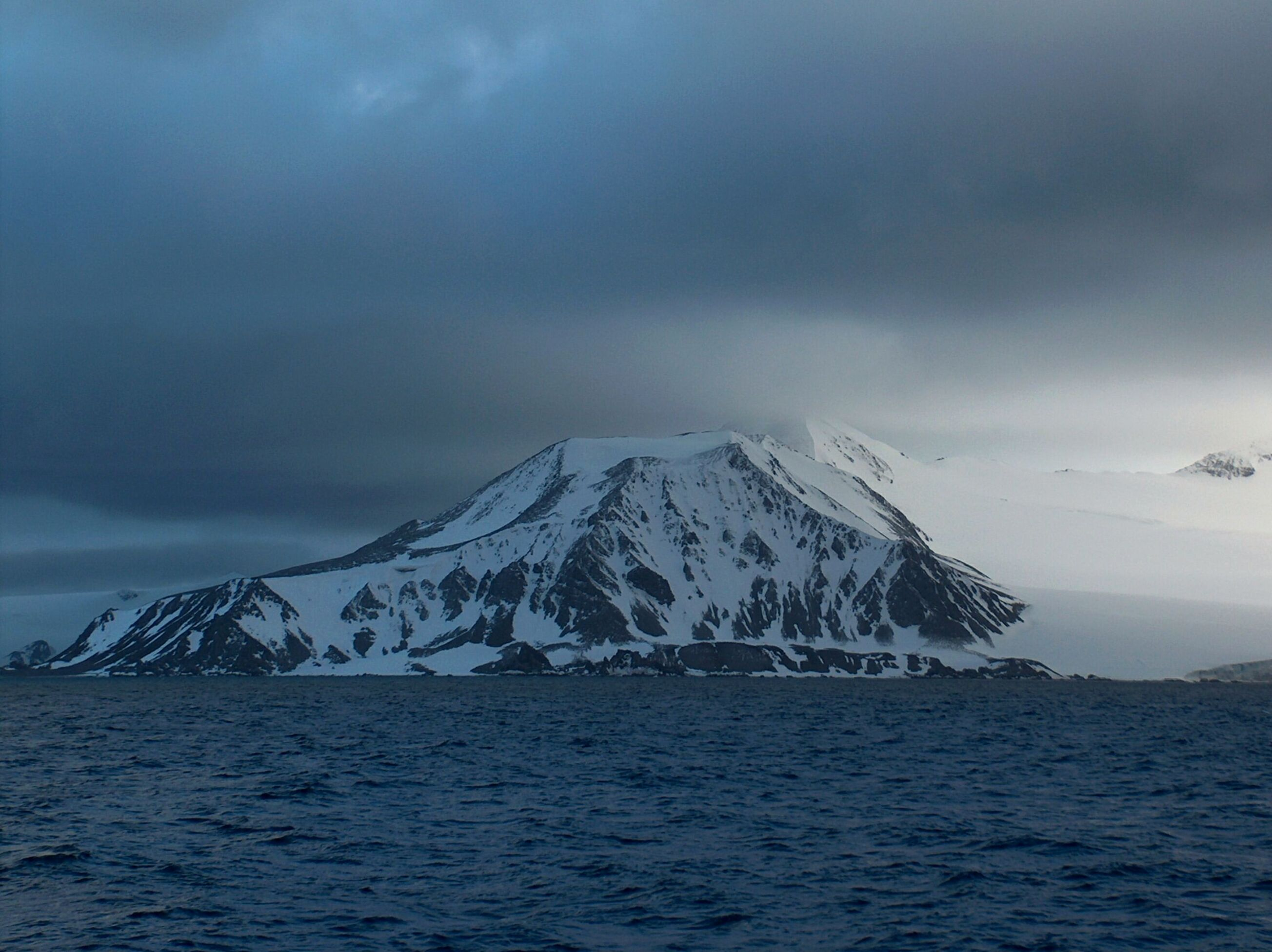
Botev Peak from Bransfield Strait.

Topographic map of Livingston Island, Greenwich, Robert, Snow and Smith Islands.

Botev Peak (Bulgarian: Ботев връх, romanized: Botev vrah, IPA: [ˈbɔtɛv ˈvrɤx]) is a peak rising to about 370 m in the southern extremity of the Veleka Ridge of Tangra Mountains, eastern Livingston Island in the South Shetland Islands, Antarctica overlooking Tarnovo Ice Piedmont to the east-northeast, Botev Point to the south, Barnard Point to the west and Arkutino Beach to the northwest. The feature takes its name from the adjacent Botev Point.

== Location ==
The peak is located at 62°45′19.8″S 60°18′31″W which is 1.48 km south of Veleka Peak, 740 m south of Dobrich Knoll and 4.05 km west-southwest of Yambol Peak. The peak was mapped by Bulgaria in 2005 and 2009 and is registered in the SCAR Composite Antarctic Gazetteer.

== Maps ==
- L.L. Ivanov et al. Antarctica: Livingston Island and Greenwich Island, South Shetland Islands. Scale 1:100000 topographic map. Sofia: Antarctic Place-names Commission of Bulgaria, 2005.
- L.L. Ivanov. Antarctica: Livingston Island and Greenwich, Robert, Snow and Smith Islands. Scale 1:120000 topographic map. Troyan: Manfred Wörner Foundation, 2009. ISBN 978-954-92032-6-4
