= Dobrich Knoll =

Coordinates: 62°44′56″S 60°18′33.5″W

Location of Tangra Mountains on Livingston Island in the South Shetland Islands.

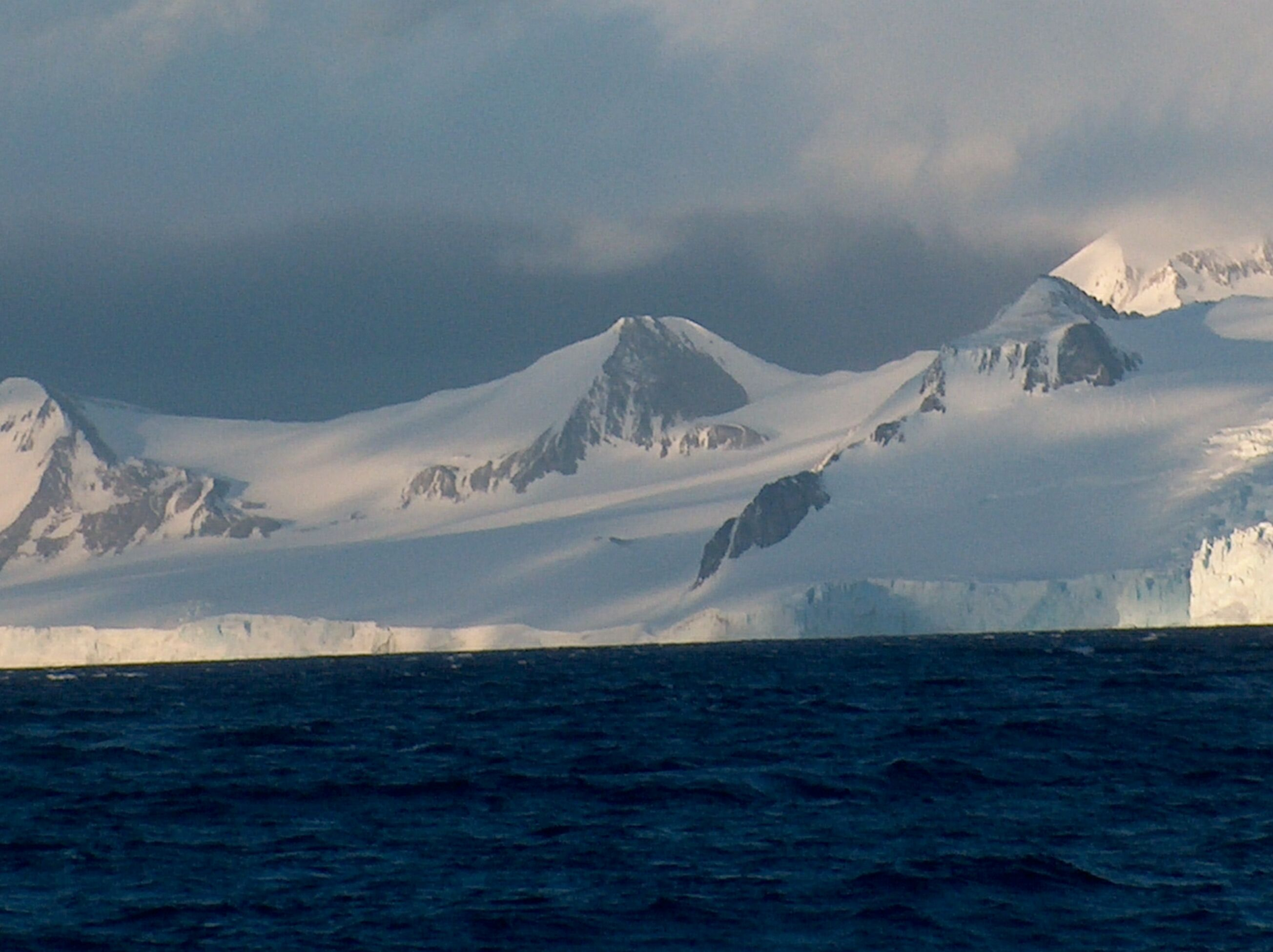
Dobrich Knoll

Topographic map of Livingston Island and Smith Island

Dobrich Knoll (Dobrichka Mogila \'do-brich-ka mo-'gi-la\) rises to over 400 m in the middle of Veleka Ridge, Tangra Mountains, eastern Livingston Island in Antarctica. It overlooks Tarnovo Ice Piedmont to the east and Arkutino Beach to the west. The knoll is named after the Bulgarian city of Dobrich.

== Location ==
The knoll is 740 m south of the summit of Veleka Ridge and 740 m north of Botev Peak, and was recorded in Bulgarian mapping in 2005 and 2009.

== Maps ==
- L.L. Ivanov et al. Antarctica: Livingston Island and Greenwich Island, South Shetland Islands. Scale 1:100000 topographic map. Sofia: Antarctic Place-names Commission of Bulgaria, 2005.
- L.L. Ivanov. Antarctica: Livingston Island and Greenwich, Robert, Snow and Smith Islands. Scale 1:120000 topographic map. Troyan: Manfred Wörner Foundation, 2010. ISBN 978-954-92032-9-5 (First edition 2009. ISBN 978-954-92032-6-4)
- Antarctic Digital Database (ADD). Scale 1:250000 topographic map of Antarctica. Scientific Committee on Antarctic Research (SCAR). Since 1993, regularly updated.
- L.L. Ivanov. Antarctica: Livingston Island and Smith Island. Scale 1:100000 topographic map. Manfred Wörner Foundation, 2017. ISBN 978-619-90008-3-0
