= Ludogorie Peak =

Mountain in Antarctica

Location of Tangra Mountains on Livingston Island in the South Shetland Islands.

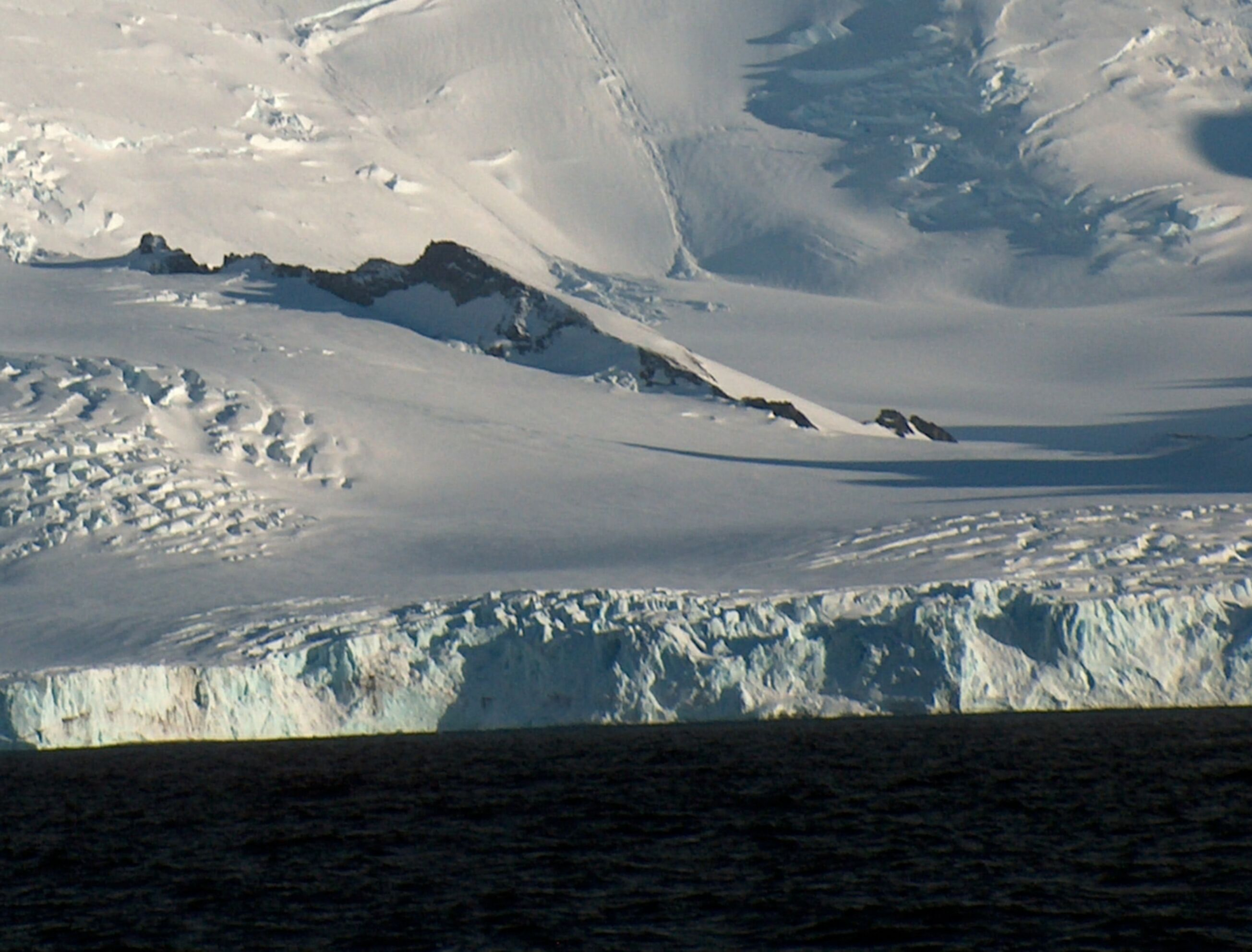
Ludogorie Peak

Topographic map of Livingston Island, Greenwich, Robert, Snow and Smith Islands.

Ludogorie Peak (Bulgarian: връх Лудогорие, romanized: vrah Ludogorie, IPA: [ˈvrɤx ɫodoˈɡɔriɛ]) is a peak rising to 350 m in Friesland Ridge, Tangra Mountains in eastern Livingston Island, South Shetland Islands in Antarctica. The peak overlooks Prespa Glacier to the west and south, Macy Glacier to the northeast, and Brunow Bay to the east, and is named after Ludogorie region in northeastern Bulgaria.

== Location ==
The peak is located at 62°43′10.5″S 60°10′30″W which is 960 m north-northwest of Needle Peak, 1.08 km south-southeast of Preslav Crag, 3.25 km southwest of Peshev Peak and 1.25 km northeast of Radomir Knoll (Bulgarian mapping in 2005 and 2009).

== Maps ==
- L.L. Ivanov et al. Antarctica: Livingston Island and Greenwich Island, South Shetland Islands. Scale 1:100000 topographic map. Sofia: Antarctic Place-names Commission of Bulgaria, 2005.
- L.L. Ivanov. Antarctica: Livingston Island and Greenwich, Robert, Snow and Smith Islands. Scale 1:120000 topographic map. Troyan: Manfred Wörner Foundation, 2009. ISBN 978-954-92032-6-4
