= Arda Peak =

Location of Tangra Mountains on Livingston Island in the South Shetland Islands.

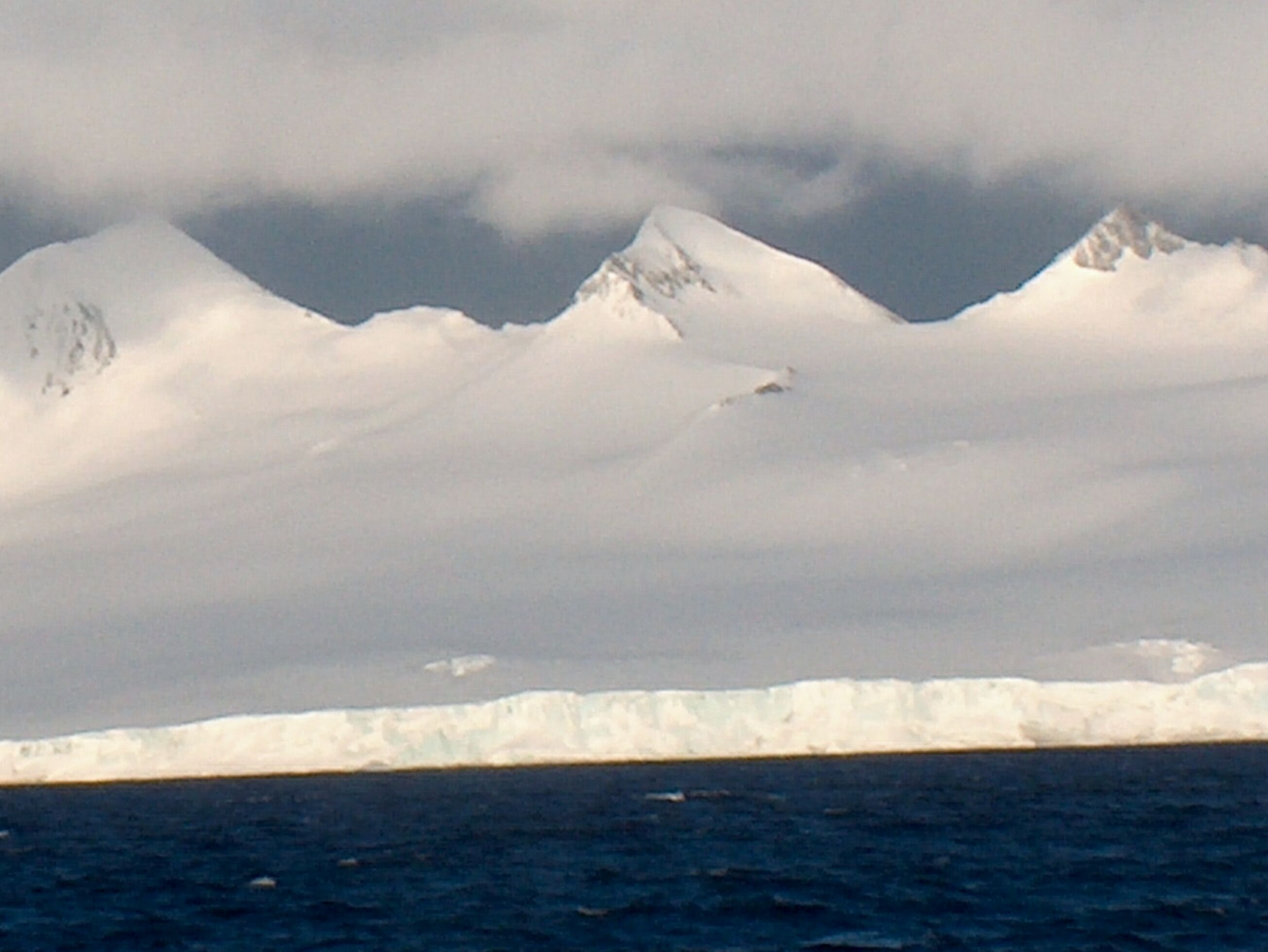
Arda Peak from Bransfield Strait.

Topographic map of Livingston Island, Greenwich, Robert, Snow and Smith Islands.

Arda Peak (Bulgarian: връх Арда, romanized: vrah Arda, IPA: [ˈvrɤx ˈardɐ]) is located in the east of Livingston Island, Antarctica. The peak rises to approximately 470 m and is located in the Friesland Ridge, Tangra Mountains, overlooking the lower course of Charity Glacier to the northwest and Tarnovo Ice Piedmont to the southeast. The peak is named after the river Arda in Bulgaria.

== Location ==
Arda Peak is located at 62°44′27.2″S 60°17′32″W which is 430 m south of Gabrovo Knoll, 890 m east by north of the summit of Veleka Ridge and 2.85 km west of Yambol Peak.

== Maps ==
- L.L. Ivanov et al. Antarctica: Livingston Island and Greenwich Island, South Shetland Islands. Scale 1:100000 topographic map. Sofia: Antarctic Place-names Commission of Bulgaria, 2005.
- L.L. Ivanov. Antarctica: Livingston Island and Greenwich, Robert, Snow and Smith Islands. Scale 1:120000 topographic map. Troyan: Manfred Wörner Foundation, 2009.
