= Opitsvet Lake =

Antarctic lake

- Location within South Shetland Islands
- Location: Livingston Island, Antarctica
- Coordinates: 62°43′37″S 60°09′12″W
- Lake type: Glacial lake
- Max. length: 420 metres (1,380 ft)
- Max. width: 410 metres (1,350 ft)
- Surface area: 11 hectares (27 acres)

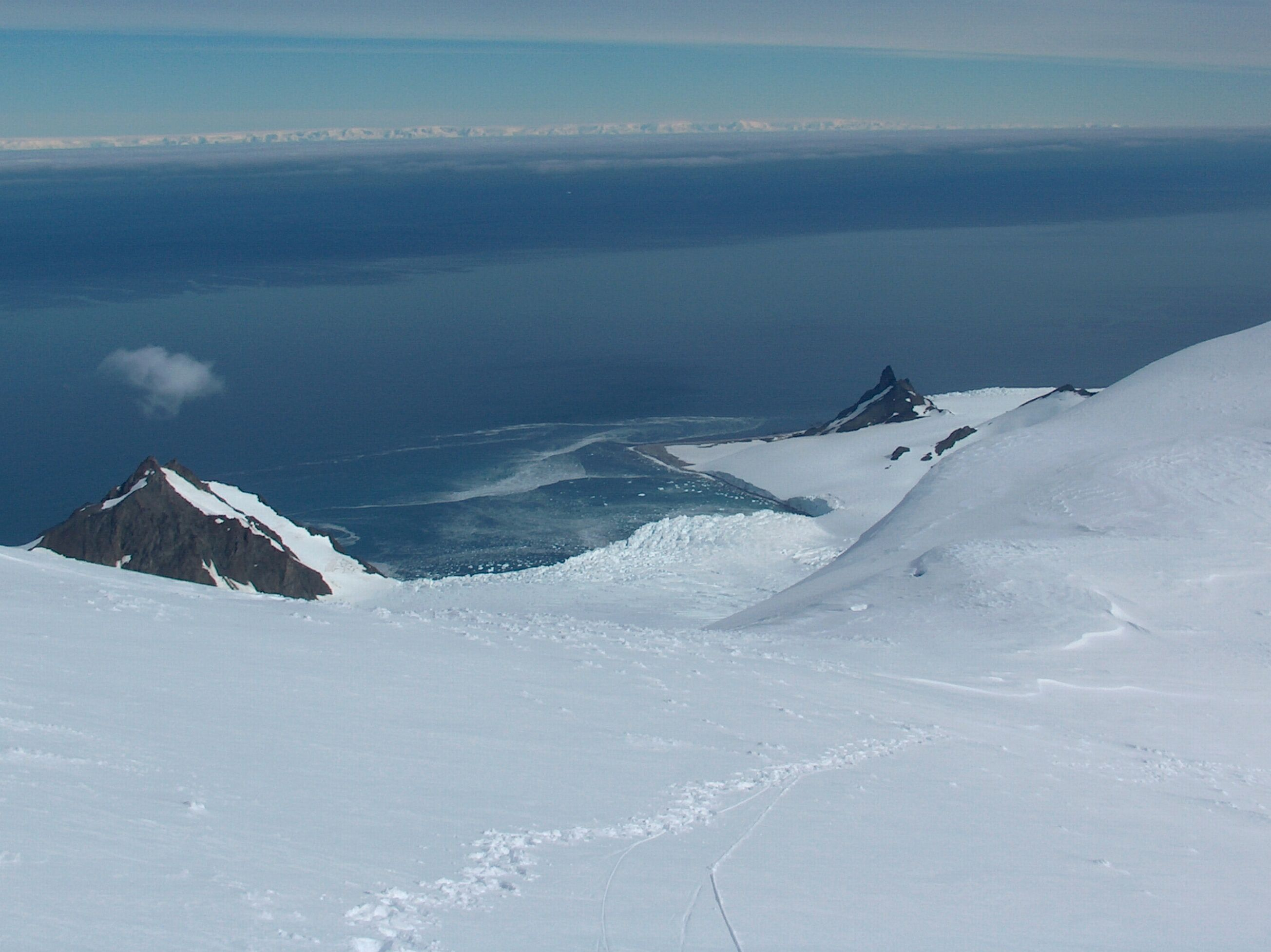
Brunow Bay from Tangra Mountains; Samuel Point with the snow-covered Opitsvet Lake is on the right

Map of Livingston Island and Smith Island

Opitsvet Lake (Bulgarian: езеро Опицвет, romanized: ezero Opitsvet, IPA: [ˈɛzɛro oˈpit͡svɛt]) is the lake extending 420 m in west–east direction and 410 m in north–south direction on the southeast coast of Rozhen Peninsula, Livingston Island in the South Shetland Islands, Antarctica. It has a surface area of 11 ha and is separated from the waters of Brunow Bay on the east and Bransfield Strait on the south by a 70 to 150 m wide strip of land. The area was visited by early 19th century sealers.

The feature is named after the settlement of Opitsvet and the eponymous marsh in Western Bulgaria.

== Location ==
Opitsvet Lake is situated at the base of Samuel Point and centred at 62°43′37″S 60°09′12″W, which is 600 m east of Needle Peak and 2.78 km southwest of Vazov Point. Bulgarian mapping of the area in 2009 and 2017.

== Maps ==
- L. Ivanov. Antarctica: Livingston Island and Greenwich, Robert, Snow and Smith Islands. Scale 1:120000 topographic map. Troyan: Manfred Wörner Foundation, 2009. ISBN 978-954-92032-6-4
- L. Ivanov. Antarctica: Livingston Island and Smith Island. Scale 1:100000 topographic map. Manfred Wörner Foundation, 2017. ISBN 978-619-90008-3-0
- Antarctic Digital Database (ADD). Scale 1:250000 topographic map of Antarctica. Scientific Committee on Antarctic Research (SCAR). Since 1993, regularly upgraded and updated

== See also ==
- Antarctic lakes
- Livingston Island
