= Vazov =

Vazov is a Bulgarian surname. It can refer to:

- Georgi Vazov, a Bulgarian Lieutenant General and Minister of War
- Ivan Vazov, a Bulgarian poet, novelist and playwright
- Vladimir Vazov, a Bulgarian Lieutenant General
- Vazov Rock, a rocky peak in the South Shetland Islands
- Vazov Point, a point on the coast of Bransfield Strait, South Shetland Islands
- Ivan Vazov National Theatre, Bulgaria's national theater
- Ivan Vazov National Library, a library situated in the Bulgarian city of Plovdiv
- Ivan Vazov Library, Botevgrad, a library contemporary educational institution
