= Vazov Rock =

Rock formation in Antarctica

Location of Tangra Mountains on Livingston Island in the South Shetland Islands.

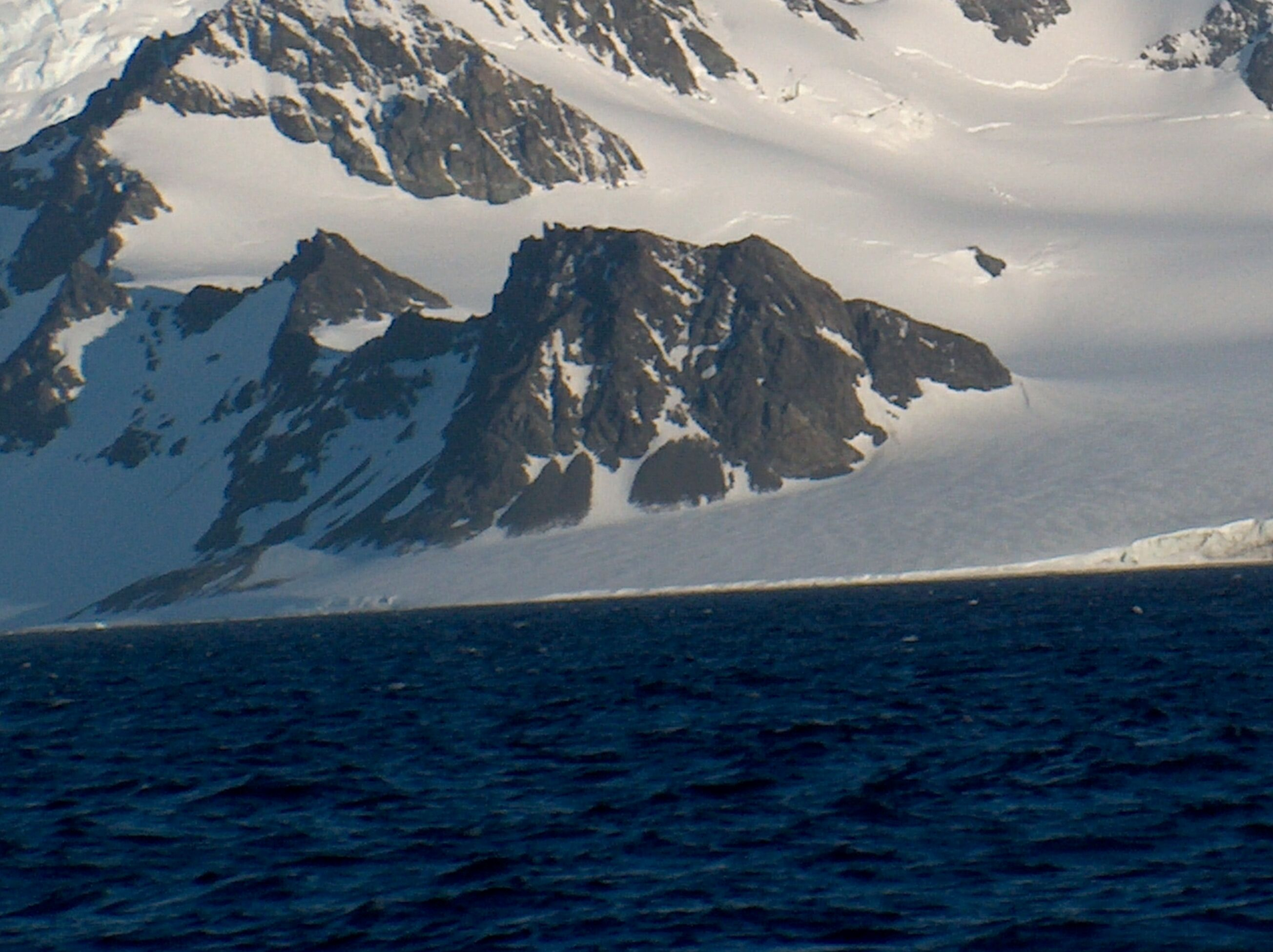
Vazov Rock from Bransfield Strait.

Topographic map of Livingston Island, Greenwich, Robert, Snow and Smith Islands.

Vazov Rock is a rocky peak of elevation of 200 m (656 ft) in the south extremity of Peshev Ridge in Tangra Mountains, eastern Livingston Island in the South Shetland Islands, Antarctica. This feature extends 300 meters (984 feet) in a southeast to northwest direction, and surmounts Vazov Point to the south, Boyana Glacier to the northeast and Brunow Bay to the southwest.

== Location ==
The peak is located at 62°42′37″S 60°07′06″W, which is 1.26 km (0.78 mi) south-southeast of Peshev Peak, 3.53 km (2.19 mi) west of Christoff Cliff and 3.02 km (1.88 mi) northeast of Needle Peak. It was mapped by the Bulgarian expedition Tangra 2004/05, who named it for the adjacent Vazov Point.

== Maps ==
- L.L. Ivanov. Antarctica: Livingston Island and Greenwich, Robert, Snow and Smith Islands. Scale 1:120000 topographic map. Troyan: Manfred Wörner Foundation, 2009. ISBN 978-954-92032-6-4
