= Klisura Peak =

Location of Tangra Mountains on Livingston Island in the South Shetland Islands.

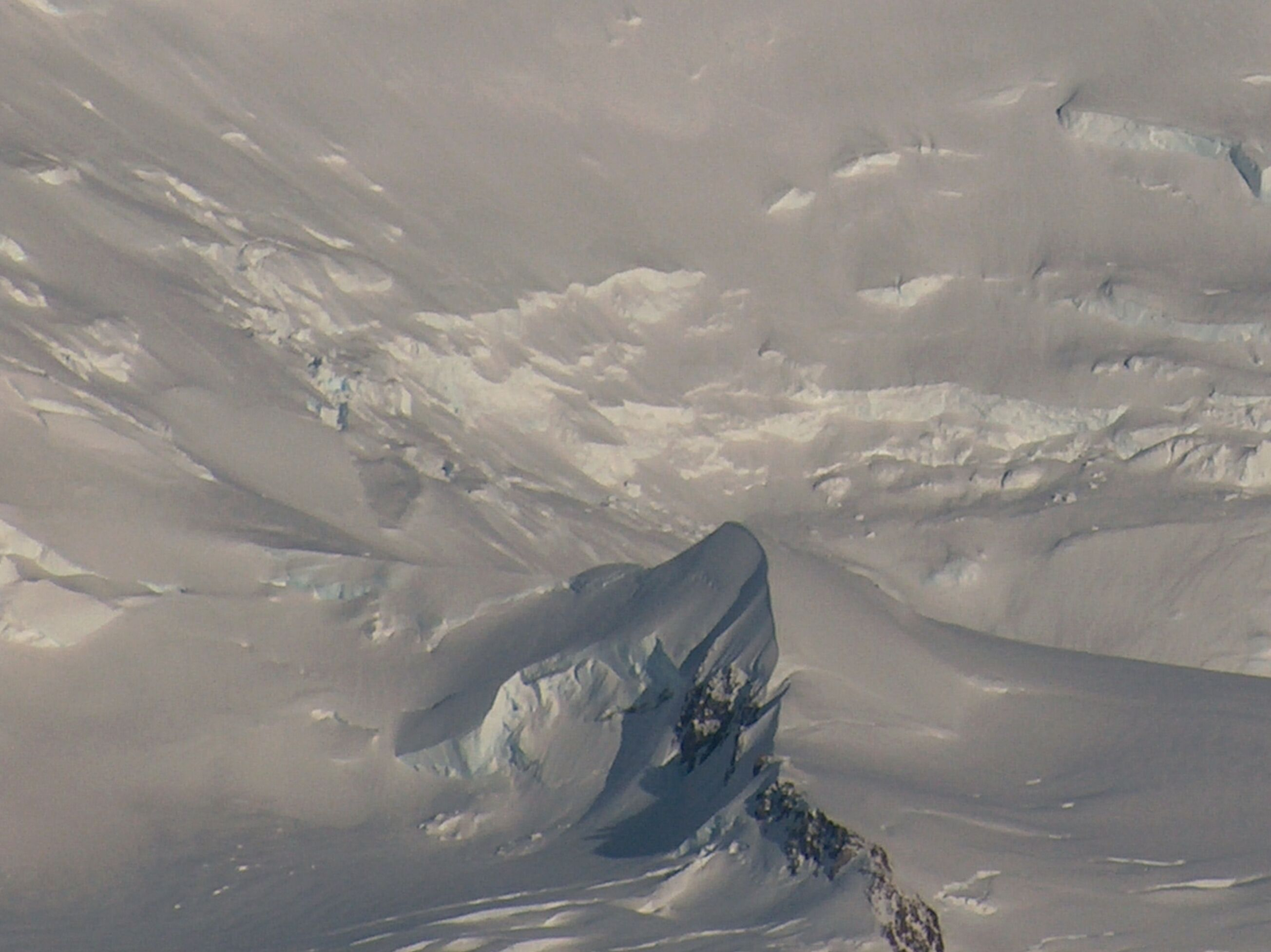
Klisura Peak from Bransfield Strait.

Topographic map of Livingston Island, Greenwich, Robert, Snow and Smith Islands.

Klisura Peak (Bulgarian: връх Клисура, romanized: vrah Klisura, IPA: [ˈvrɤx kliˈsurɐ]) is a peak rising to approx. 600 m in Friesland Ridge, Tangra Mountains, eastern Livingston Island in the South Shetland Islands, Antarctica. The peak overlooks Macy Glacier to the northeast, east and southeast and was named after the Bulgarian town of Klisura.

== Location ==
The peak is located at 62°41′41″S 60°10′26″W which is 3.83 km south-southwest of Lyaskovets Peak, 2.8 km south by east of Mount Friesland, 1.75 km east of Simeon Peak, 1.75 km north of Preslav Crag and 2.55 km west by north of the Peshev Peak (Bulgarian mapping in 2005 and 2009).

== Maps ==
- L.L. Ivanov et al. Antarctica: Livingston Island and Greenwich Island, South Shetland Islands. Scale 1:100000 topographic map. Sofia: Antarctic Place-names Commission of Bulgaria, 2005.
- L.L. Ivanov. Antarctica: Livingston Island and Greenwich, Robert, Snow and Smith Islands. Scale 1:120000 topographic map. Troyan: Manfred Wörner Foundation, 2009.
