= Tarnovo Ice Piedmont =

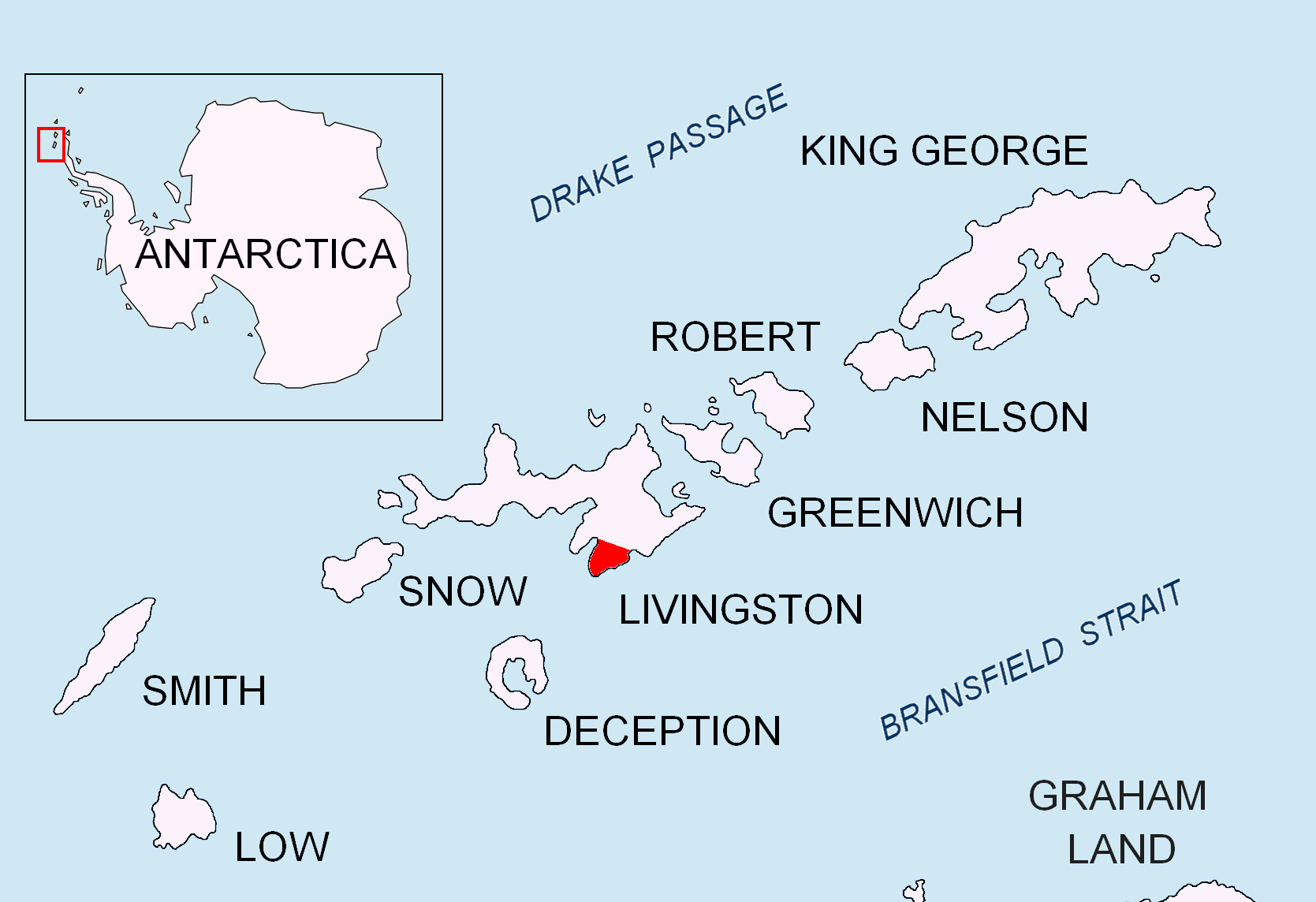
Location of Rozhen Peninsula on Livingston Island in the South Shetland Islands.

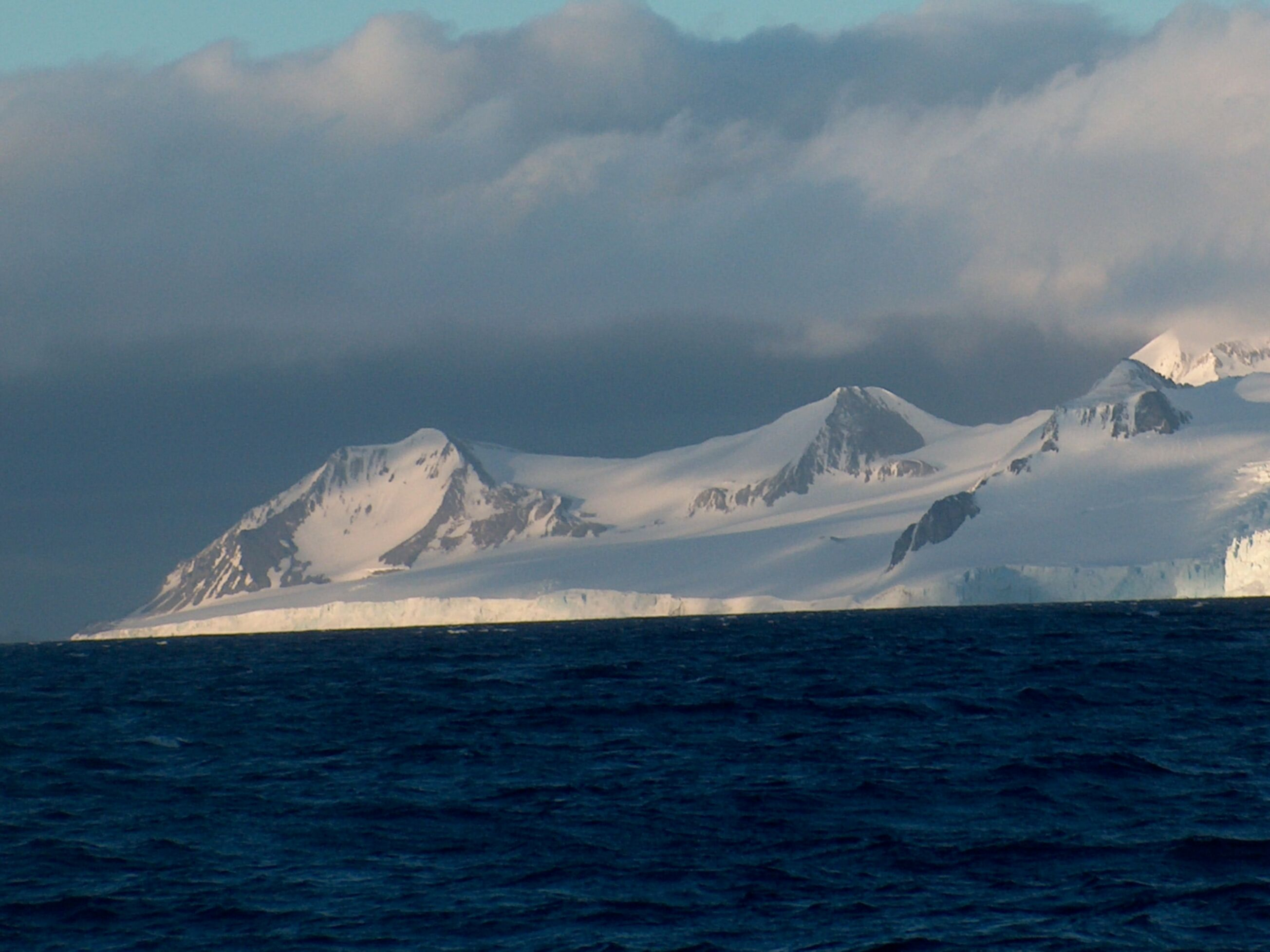
Tarnovo Ice Piedmont from Bransfield Strait, with Veleka Ridge in the background.

Topographic map of Livingston Island and Smith Island.

Tarnovo Ice Piedmont (Bulgarian: ледник Търново, romanized: lednik Tarnovo, IPA: [ˈlɛdnik ˈtɤrnovo]) is an ice piedmont on Rozhen Peninsula, Livingston Island in the South Shetland Islands, Antarctica is situated southeast of Charity Glacier and west-southwest of Prespa Glacier. It extends 3.5 km in east-west direction and 2.5 km in north-south direction, is bounded to the west by Veleka Ridge, to the north by Arda Peak, Gerov Pass and Shumen Peak, and to the east by Yambol Peak, and flows southeastwards into Bransfield Strait east of Botev Point and west of Gela Point.

The feature is named after the city of Tarnovo (Veliko Tarnovo) in northern Bulgaria, the capital of the medieval Second Bulgarian Empire.

== Location ==
The midpoint is located at 62°44′55″S 60°16′10″W (UK Directorate of Overseas Surveys mapping in 1968, and Bulgarian mapping in 2005 and 2009).

== Maps ==
- South Shetland Islands. Scale 1:200000 topographic map. DOS 610 Sheet W 62 60. Tolworth, UK, 1968.
- Islas Livingston y Decepción. Mapa topográfico a escala 1:100000. Madrid: Servicio Geográfico del Ejército, 1991.
- S. Soccol, D. Gildea and J. Bath. Livingston Island, Antarctica. Scale 1:100000 satellite map. The Omega Foundation, USA, 2004.
- L.L. Ivanov et al., Antarctica: Livingston Island and Greenwich Island, South Shetland Islands (from English Strait to Morton Strait, with illustrations and ice-cover distribution), 1:100000 scale topographic map, Antarctic Place-names Commission of Bulgaria, Sofia, 2005
- L.L. Ivanov. Antarctica: Livingston Island and Greenwich, Robert, Snow and Smith Islands. Scale 1:120000 topographic map. Troyan: Manfred Wörner Foundation, 2010. ISBN 978-954-92032-9-5 (First edition 2009. ISBN 978-954-92032-6-4)
- Antarctic Digital Database (ADD). Scale 1:250000 topographic map of Antarctica. Scientific Committee on Antarctic Research (SCAR). Since 1993, regularly upgraded and updated.
- L.L. Ivanov. Antarctica: Livingston Island and Smith Island. Scale 1:100000 topographic map. Manfred Wörner Foundation, 2017. ISBN 978-619-90008-3-0
