= Vazov Point =

Location of Livingston Island in the South Shetland Islands.

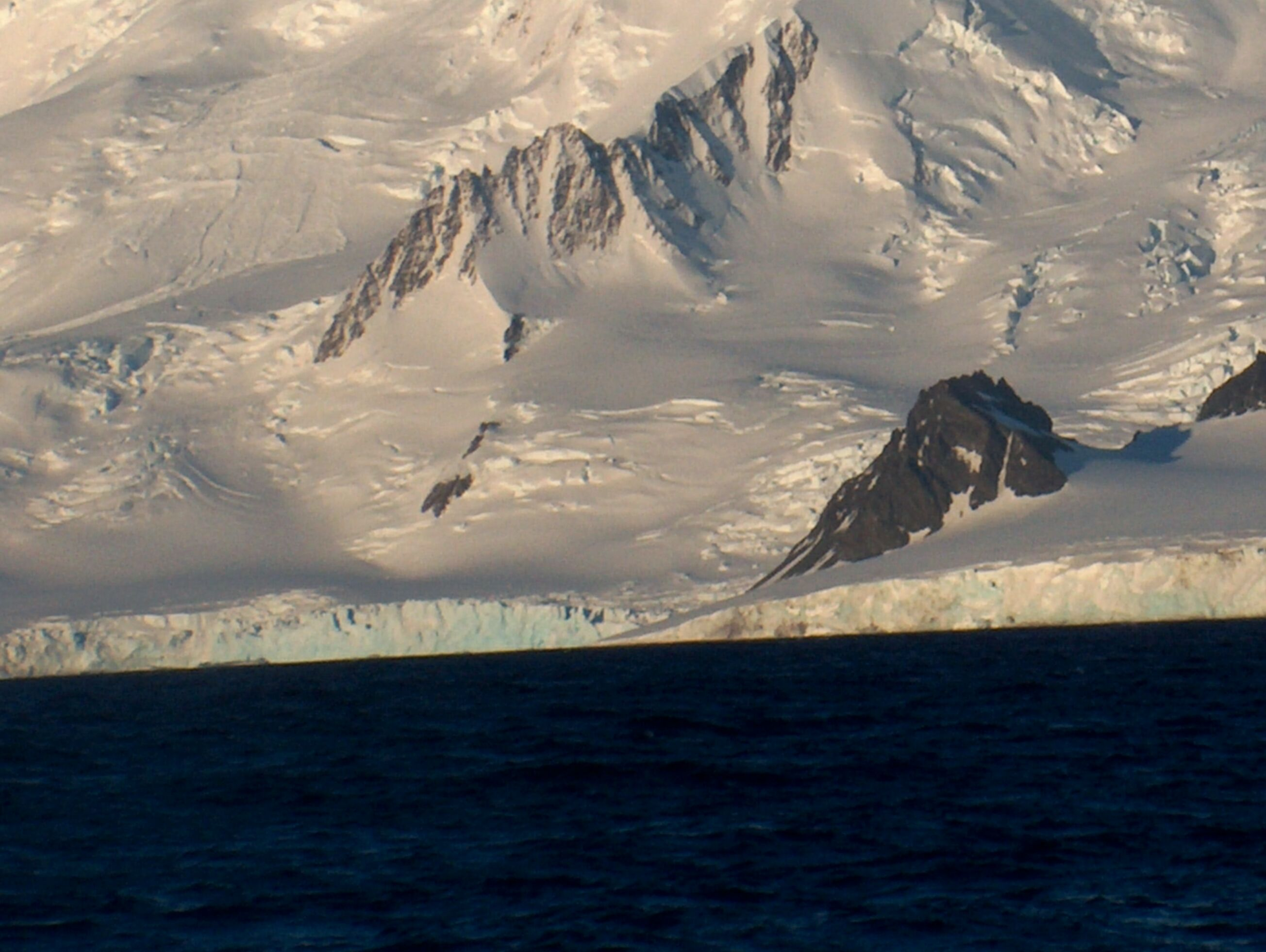
Vazov Point from Bransfield Strait, with Vazov Rock on the right and Preslav Crag in the background.

Topographic map of Livingston Island, Greenwich, Robert, Snow and Smith Islands.

Vazov Point is a point on the coast of Bransfield Strait forming the northeast side of the entrance to Brunow Bay on Livingston Island in the South Shetland Islands, Antarctica. This landmark is surmounted by Vazov Rock.

== Location ==
The point is located at 62°42′50.5″S 60°06′50″W, which is 2.35 km (1.46 mi) northeast of Samuel Point and 3.38 km (2.1 mi) west by south of Aytos Point. It was mapped by the Bulgarian expedition Tangra 2004/05, who named it for the Bulgarian poet and playwright Ivan Vazov. British mapping in 1968, Chilean in 1971, Argentine in 1980, and Bulgarian in 2005 and 2009.

== Maps ==
- L.L. Ivanov et al. Antarctica: Livingston Island and Greenwich Island, South Shetland Islands. Scale 1:100000 topographic map. Sofia: Antarctic Place-names Commission of Bulgaria, 2005.
- L.L. Ivanov. Antarctica: Livingston Island and Greenwich, Robert, Snow and Smith Islands. Scale 1:120000 topographic map. Troyan: Manfred Wörner Foundation, 2009. ISBN 978-954-92032-6-4
