= Opitsvet =

Opitsvet, Bulgaria Опицвет
- Location of Opitsvet
- Coordinates: 42°52′N 23°6′E
- Country: Bulgaria
- Provinces (Oblast): Sofia
- Elevation: 576 m (1,890 ft)

Population (2005)
  - Total: 368
- Time zone: UTC+2 (EET)
  - Summer (DST): UTC+3 (EEST)
- Postal Code: 2235
- Area code: 07110
- License plate: B

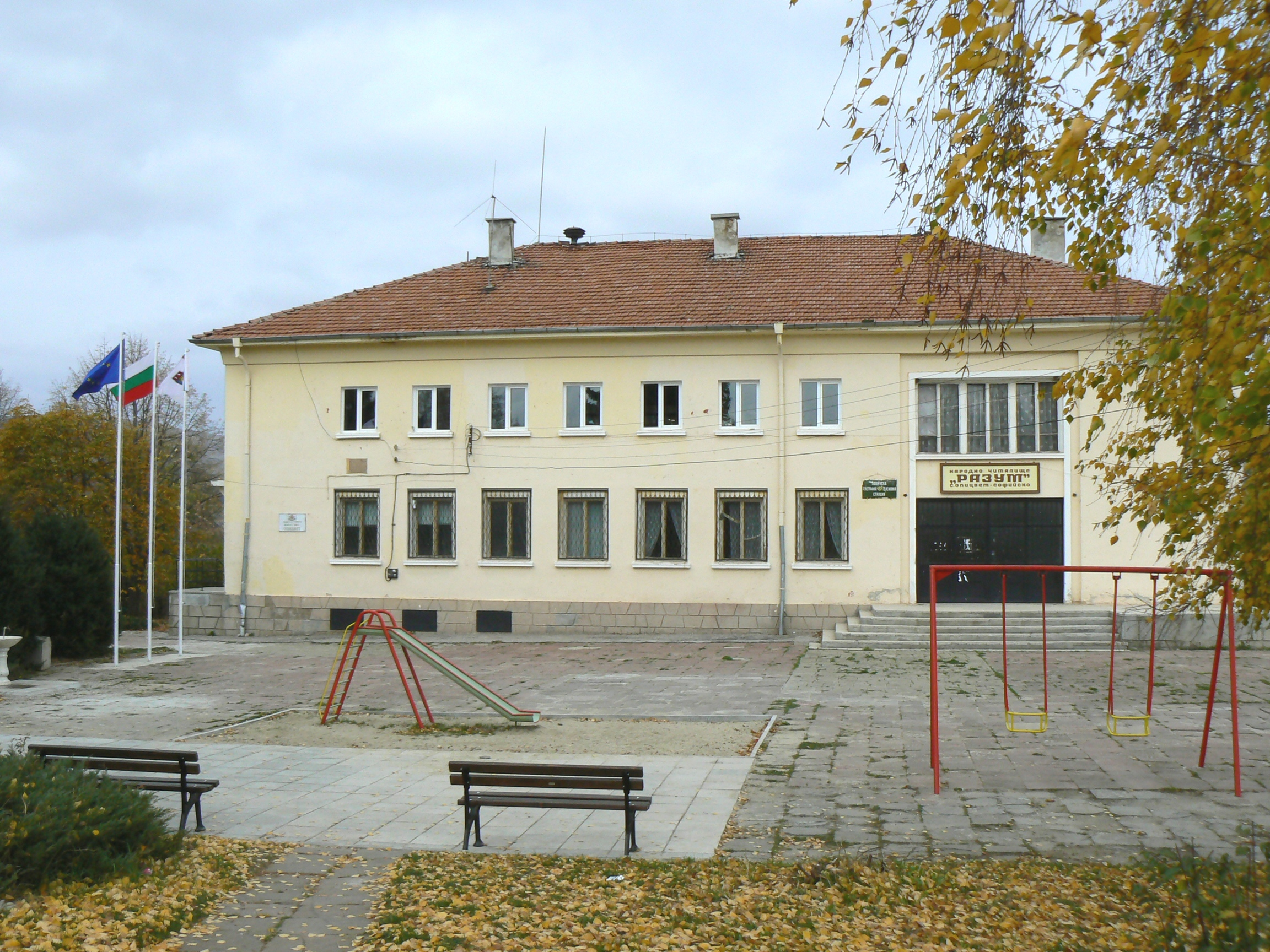
The building of the mayors and the library of village Opitsvet, Bulgaria

Opitsvet (Bulgarian: Опицвет) is a village in Kostinbrod Municipality, Sofia Province, located in western Bulgaria approximately 31 km from the capital city of Sofia and 11 km west of the town of Kostinbrod. The village was first mentioned as Opiçvud and Opiçved in Ottoman registers of 1576. The name may be linked to the adjective from lop ("butterbur") and the common noun tsvet ("blossom").

== Honours ==
Opitsvet Lake in Antarctica is named after the village.
