= Botev Point =

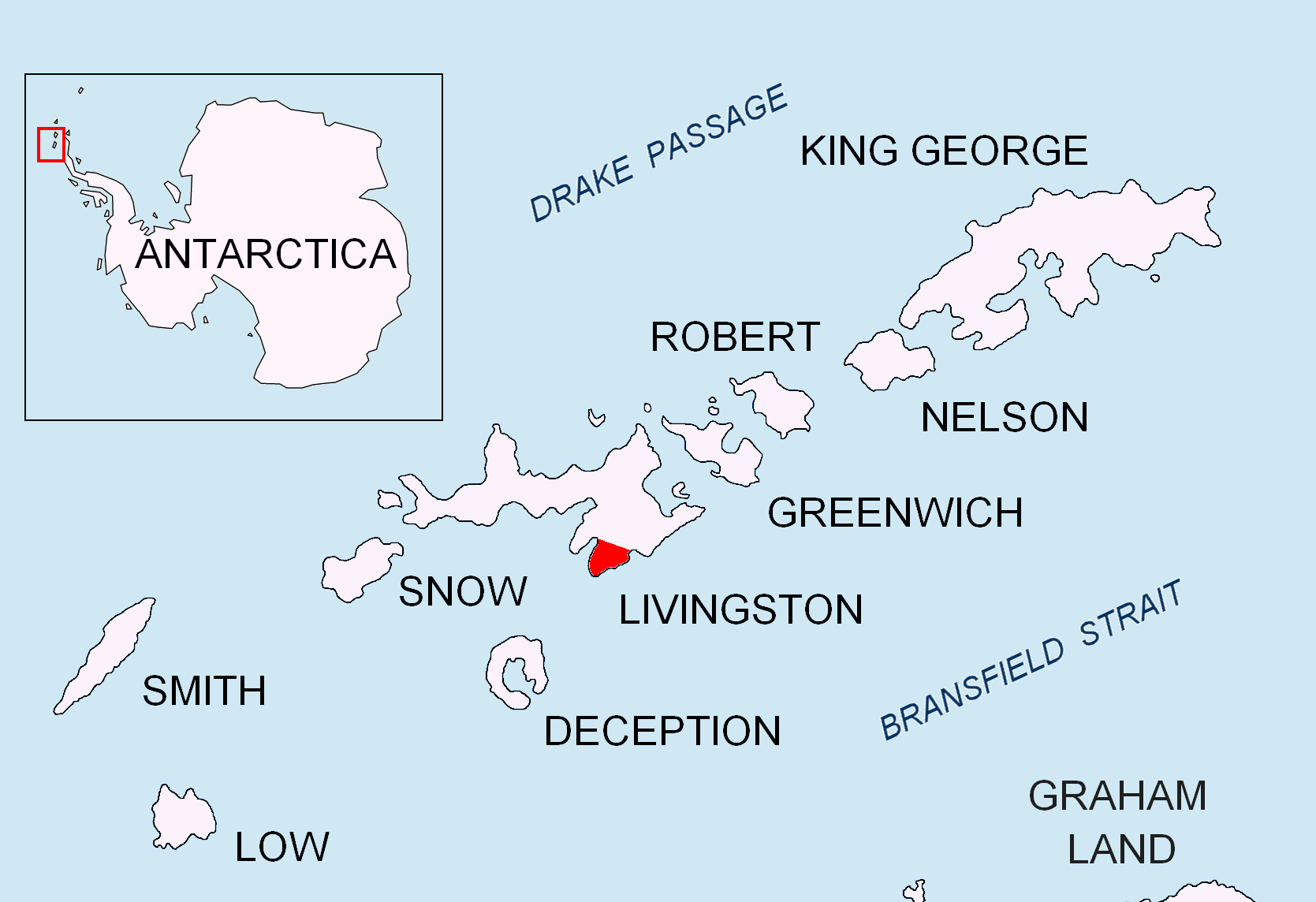
Location of Rozhen Peninsula, Livingston Island in the South Shetland Islands.

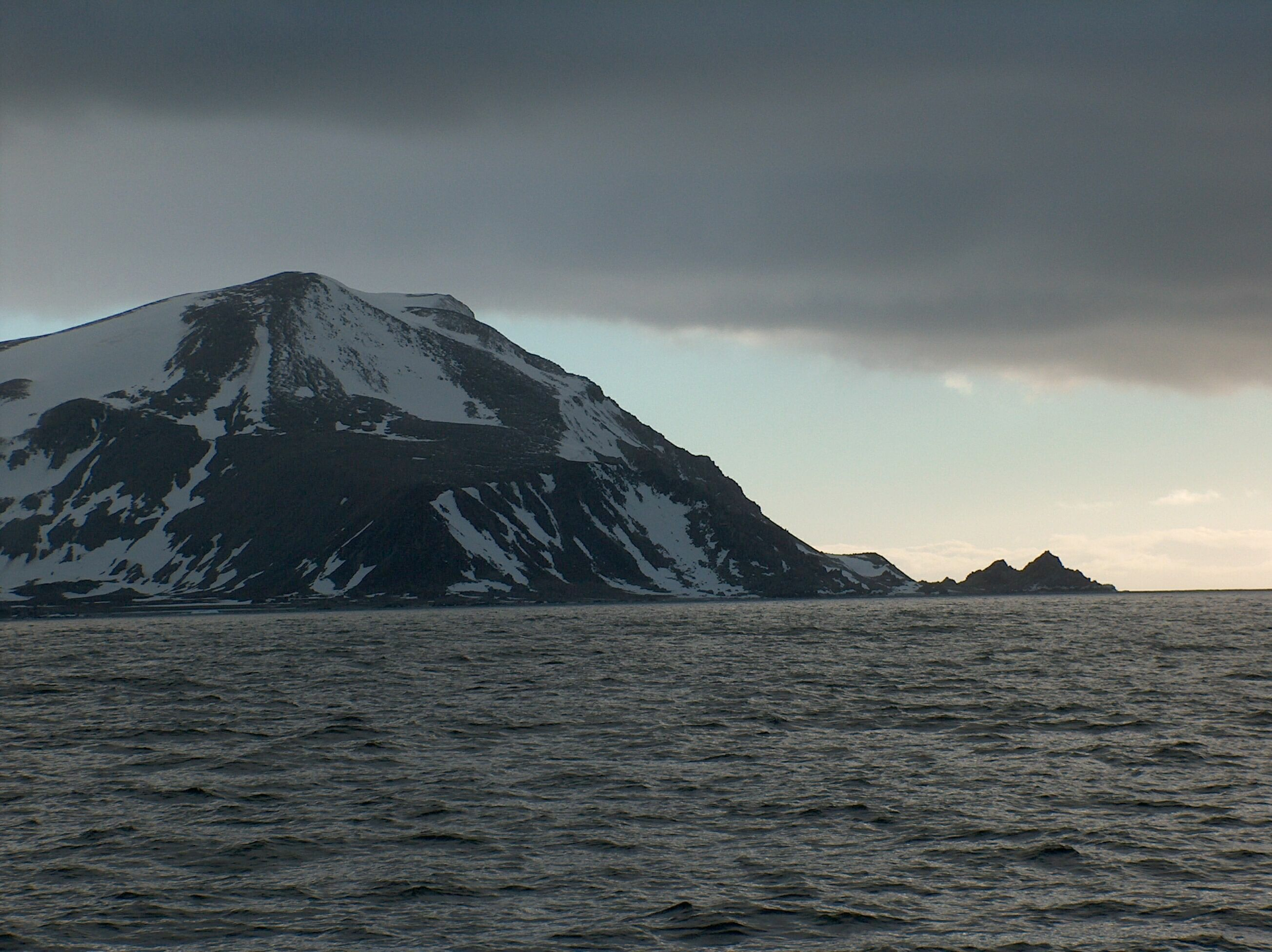
Botev Point

Topographic map of Livingston Island, Greenwich, Robert, Snow and Smith Islands.

Botev Point (Bulgarian: нос Ботев, romanized: nos Botev, IPA: [ˈnɔz ˈbɔtɛf]) is the south extremity of both Rozhen Peninsula and Livingston Island in the South Shetland Islands, Antarctica formed by an offshoot of Botev Peak in the Veleka Ridge of Tangra Mountains.

The feature is named after Hristo Botev (1848–1876), poet and leader of the Bulgarian liberation movement.

== Location ==
The point is located at 62°45′49.6″S 60°18′46″W which is 1.5 km east-southeast of Barnard Point, 5.1 km west-southwest of Gela Point and 9.29 km west-southwest of Samuel Point. The point was mapped in 1968 by the UK Directorate of Overseas Surveys, and in 2005 and 2009 by Bulgaria.

== Maps ==
- L.L. Ivanov et al. Antarctica: Livingston Island and Greenwich Island, South Shetland Islands. Scale 1:100000 topographic map. Sofia: Antarctic Place-names Commission of Bulgaria, 2005.
- L.L. Ivanov. Antarctica: Livingston Island and Greenwich, Robert, Snow and Smith Islands. Scale 1:120000 topographic map. Troyan: Manfred Wörner Foundation, 2009. ISBN 978-954-92032-6-4
