= Arkutino Beach =

Beach in Antarctica

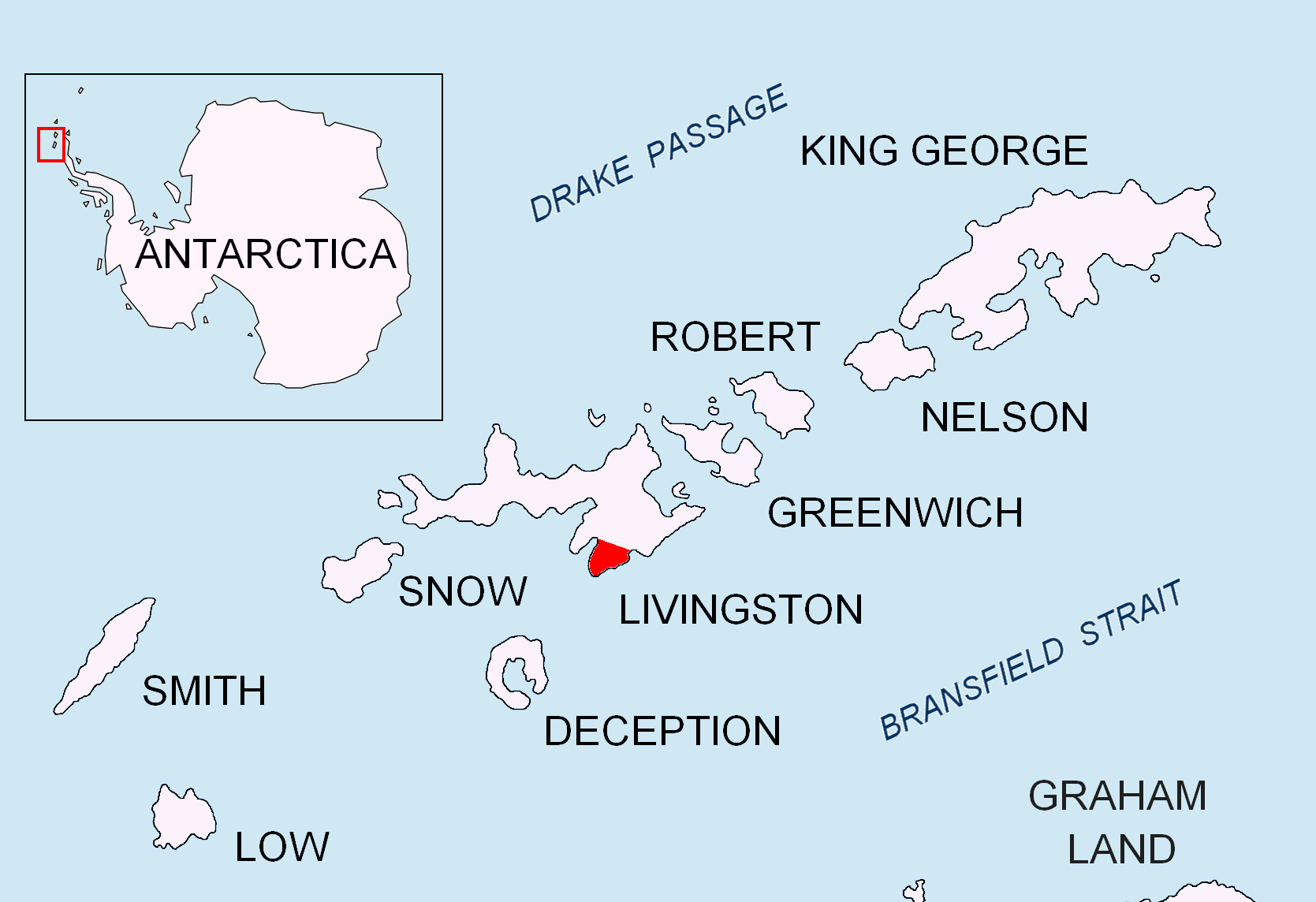
Location of Rozhen Peninsula in the South Shetland Islands.

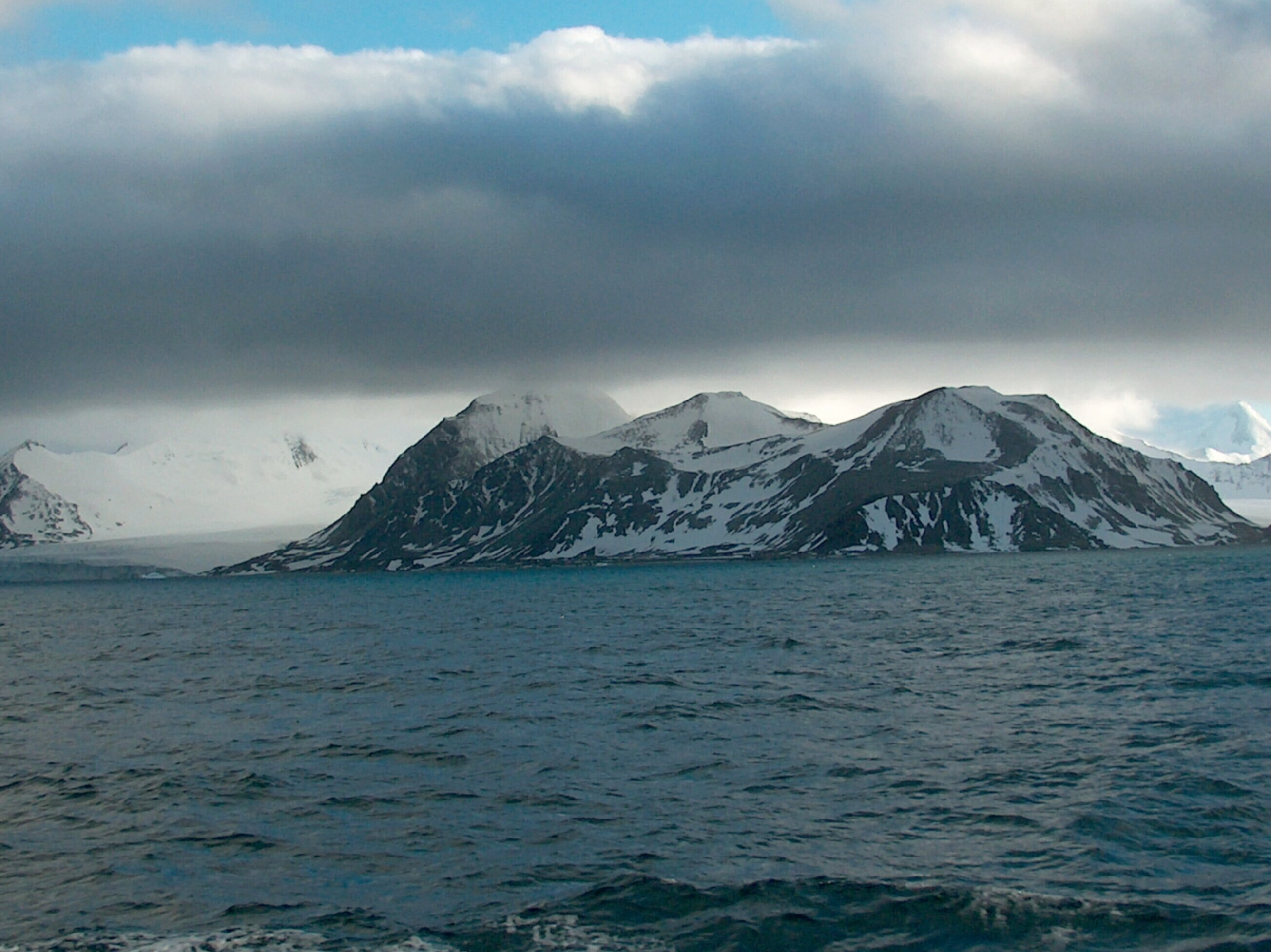
Arkutino Beach from southwest, with Veleka Ridge in the background.

Topographic map of Livingston Island and Smith Island

Arkutino Beach (Bulgarian: бряг Аркутино, romanized: bryag Arkutino, IPA: [ˈbrʲak ɐrˈkutino]) is a beach extending 1.8 km on the east coast of False Bay, Livingston Island, Antarctica. The beach is situated on Rozhen Peninsula, and is bounded by Charity Glacier to the north, Barnard Point to the south, and Veleka Ridge to the east. It is snow-free in the summer. The ice-free surface area of the beach and the adjacent Veleka Ridge is 468 hectares (1,160 acres).

The feature was named after the coastal lagoon of Arkutino in southeastern Bulgaria.

== Location ==
Arkutino Beach is centred at 62°45′00″S 60°19′44″W (Bulgarian mapping in 2005, 2009 and 2017).

== See also ==
- Tangra Mountains
- Livingston Island
- List of Bulgarian toponyms in Antarctica
- Antarctic Place-names Commission

== Maps ==
- L.L. Ivanov et al. Antarctica: Livingston Island and Greenwich Island, South Shetland Islands. Scale 1:100000 topographic map. Sofia: Antarctic Place-names Commission of Bulgaria, 2005.
- Antarctic Digital Database (ADD). Scale 1:250000 topographic map of Antarctica. Scientific Committee on Antarctic Research (SCAR). Since 1993, regularly upgraded and updated.
- L.L. Ivanov. Antarctica: Livingston Island and Smith Island. Scale 1:100000 topographic map. Manfred Wörner Foundation, 2017. ISBN 978-619-90008-3-0
