= Preslav Crag =

Location of Tangra Mountains on Livingston Island in the South Shetland Islands.

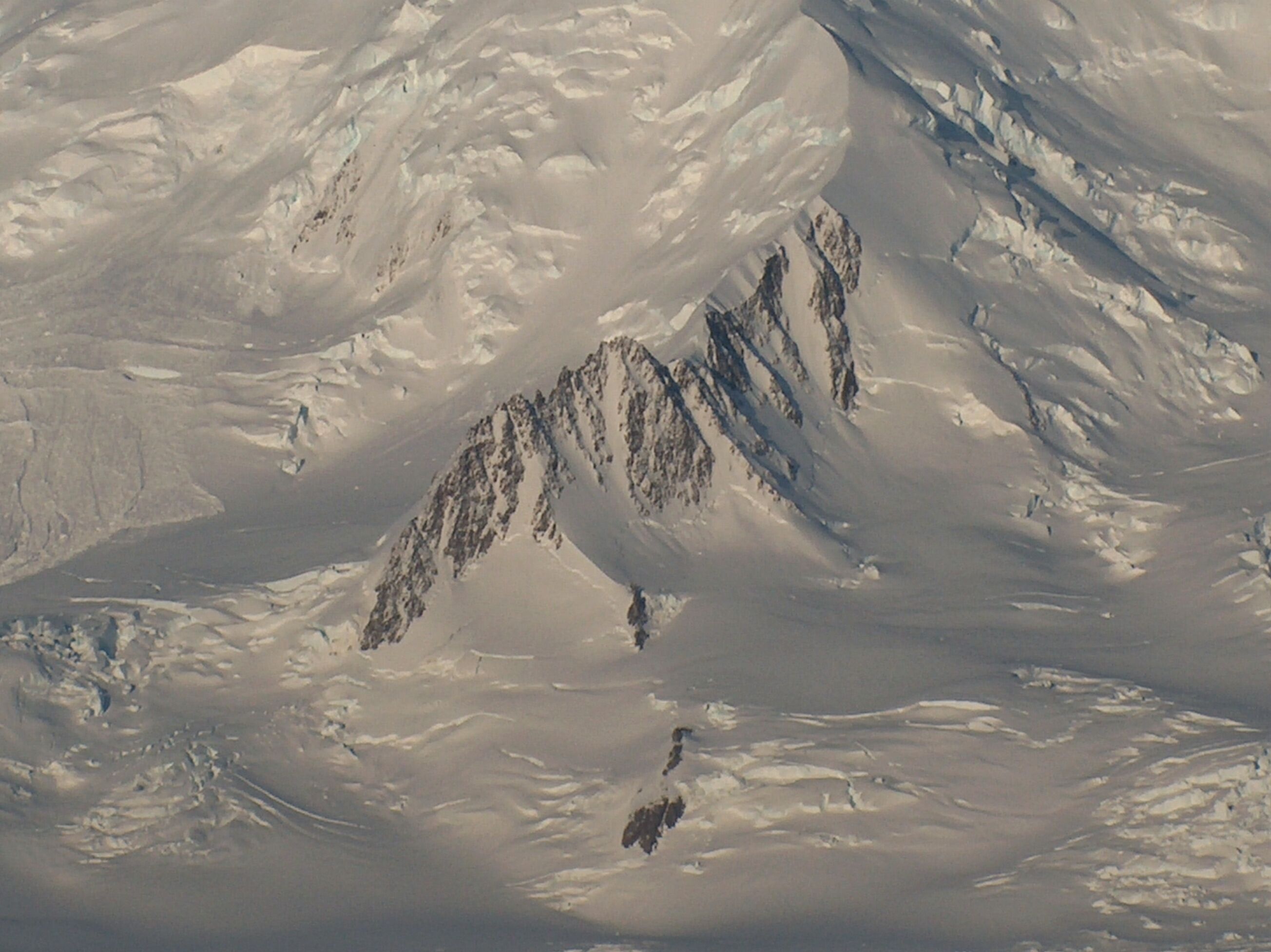
Preslav Crag from Bransfield Strait.

Topographic map of Livingston Island, Greenwich, Robert, Snow and Smith Islands.

Preslav Crag (Bulgarian: връх Преслав, romanized: vrah Preslav, IPA: [ˈvrɤx prɛˈsɫaf]) is a sharp peak rising to approx. 600 m in Friesland Ridge, Tangra Mountains, eastern Livingston Island in the South Shetland Islands, Antarctica. The peak has precipitous and ice-free south-western and north-eastern slopes and overlooks Prespa Glacier to the southwest and Macy Glacier to the northeast, the latter flowing between Preslav Crag and Peshev Ridge into Brunow Bay.

The peak is named after the Bulgarian town of Preslav (Veliki Preslav), that in the ninth century was the capital of the First Bulgarian Kingdom.

== Location ==
The crag is located at 62°42′36.7″S 60°10′48.5″W, which is 1.85 km east-southeast of St. Cyril Peak, 1.75 km south-southwest of Klisura Peak, 3.05 km west-southwest of Peshev Peak and 2.02 km north-northwest of Needle Peak (Bulgarian mapping in 2005 and 2009).

== Maps ==
- L.L. Ivanov et al. Antarctica: Livingston Island and Greenwich Island, South Shetland Islands. Scale 1:100000 topographic map. Sofia: Antarctic Place-names Commission of Bulgaria, 2005.
- L.L. Ivanov. Antarctica: Livingston Island and Greenwich, Robert, Snow and Smith Islands. Scale 1:120000 topographic map. Troyan: Manfred Wörner Foundation, 2009.
