= Gela Point =

Coordinates: 62°44′30″S 60°13′28″W

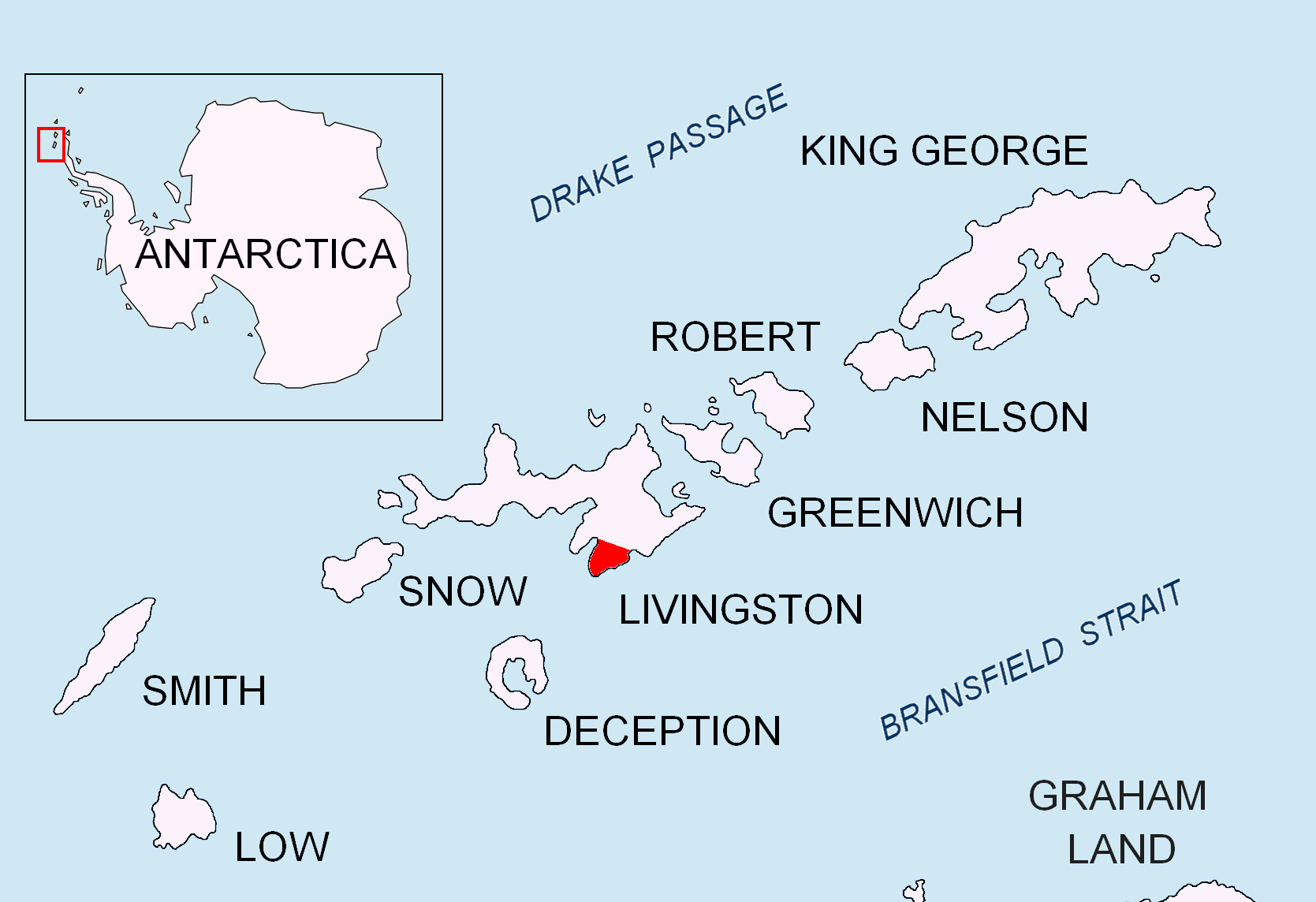
Location of Rozhen Peninsula on Livingston Island in the South Shetland Islands.

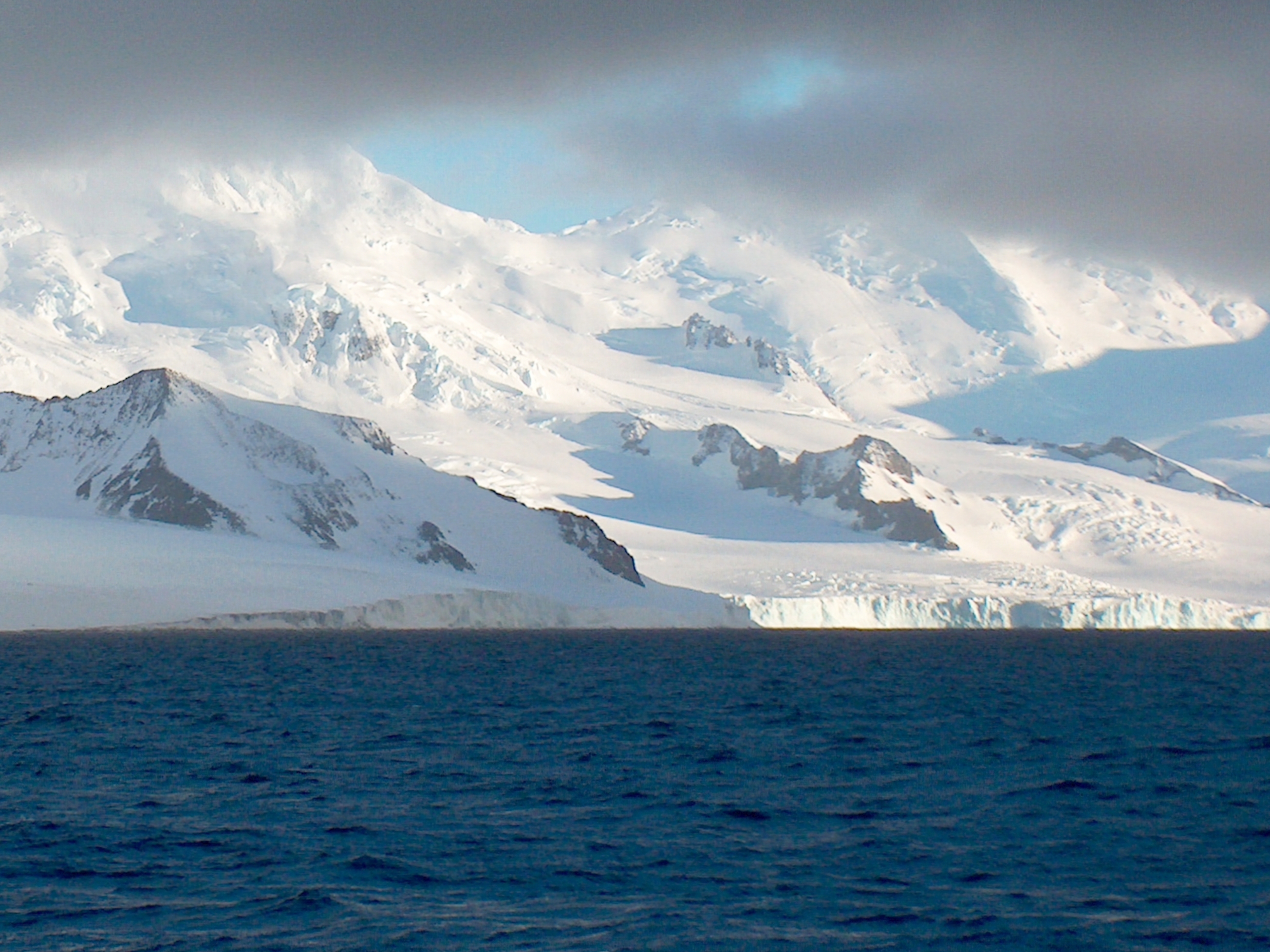
Gela Point

Topographic map of Livingston Island and Smith Island

Gela Point (Nos Gela \'nos ge-'la\) is a point on the west side of the entrance to Chavei Cove on the southeast coast of Rozhen Peninsula on Livingston Island, Antarctica formed by an offshoot of Yambol Peak. Situated on the coast of Bransfield Strait 5.1 km east-northeast of Botev Point, 700 m east-southeast of Yambol Peak, and 4.1 km west-southwest of Samuel Point. Formed as a result of recent retreat of the adjacent Prespa Glacier to the northeast. Bulgarian topographic survey Tangra 2004/05. Named after the settlement of Gela in the central Rhodope Mountains, Bulgaria.

== Maps ==
- L.L. Ivanov et al. Antarctica: Livingston Island and Greenwich Island, South Shetland Islands. Scale 1:100000 topographic map. Sofia: Antarctic Place-names Commission of Bulgaria, 2005.
- L.L. Ivanov. Antarctica: Livingston Island and Greenwich, Robert, Snow and Smith Islands. Scale 1:120000 topographic map. Troyan: Manfred Wörner Foundation, 2009. ISBN 978-954-92032-6-4
- Antarctic Digital Database (ADD). Scale 1:250000 topographic map of Antarctica. Scientific Committee on Antarctic Research (SCAR). Since 1993, regularly upgraded and updated.
- L.L. Ivanov. Antarctica: Livingston Island and Smith Island. Scale 1:100000 topographic map. Manfred Wörner Foundation, 2017. ISBN 978-619-90008-3-0
