= Chavei Cove =

Cove in the South Shetland Islands, Antarctica

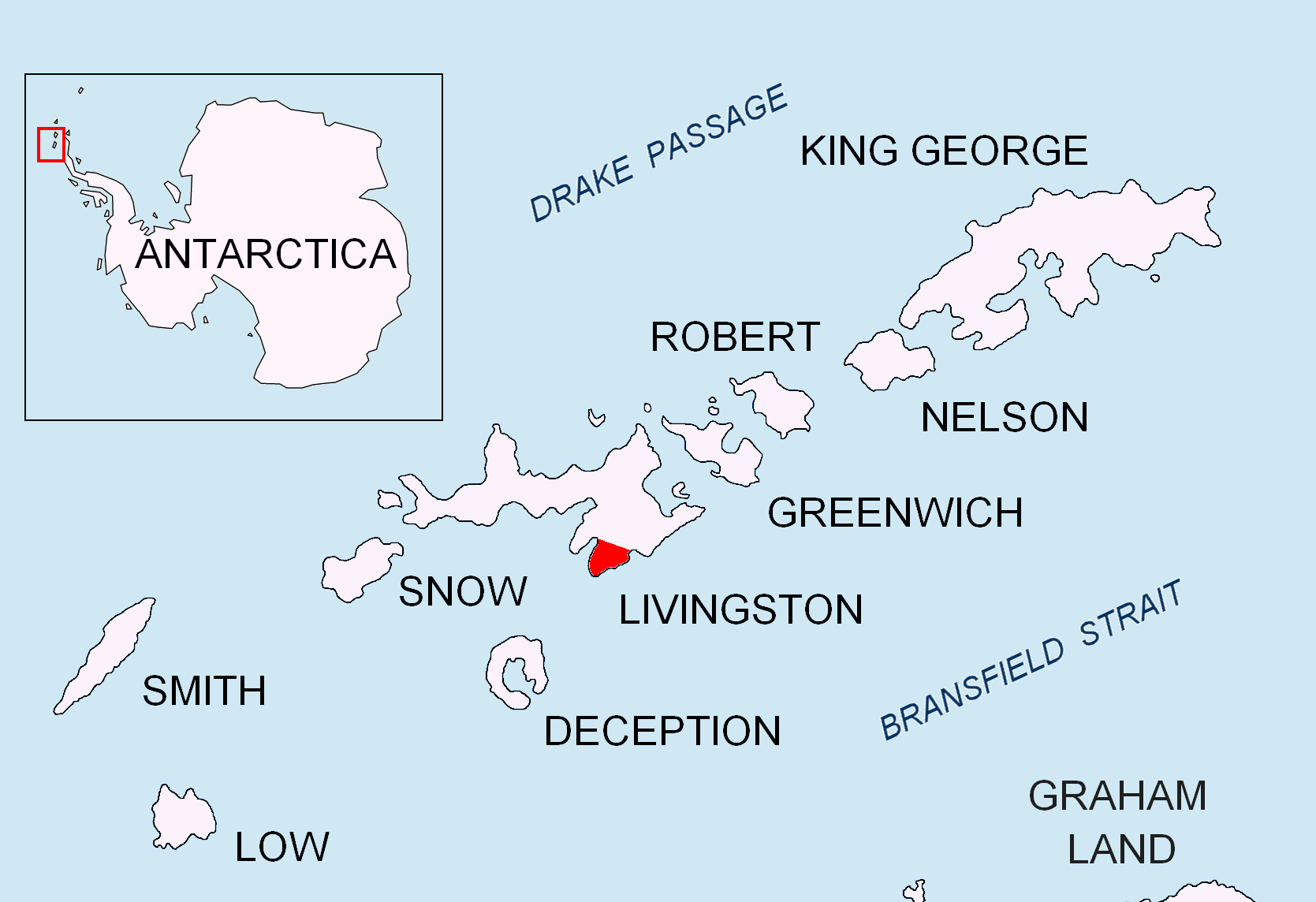
Location of Rozhen Peninsula on Livingston Island in the South Shetland Islands

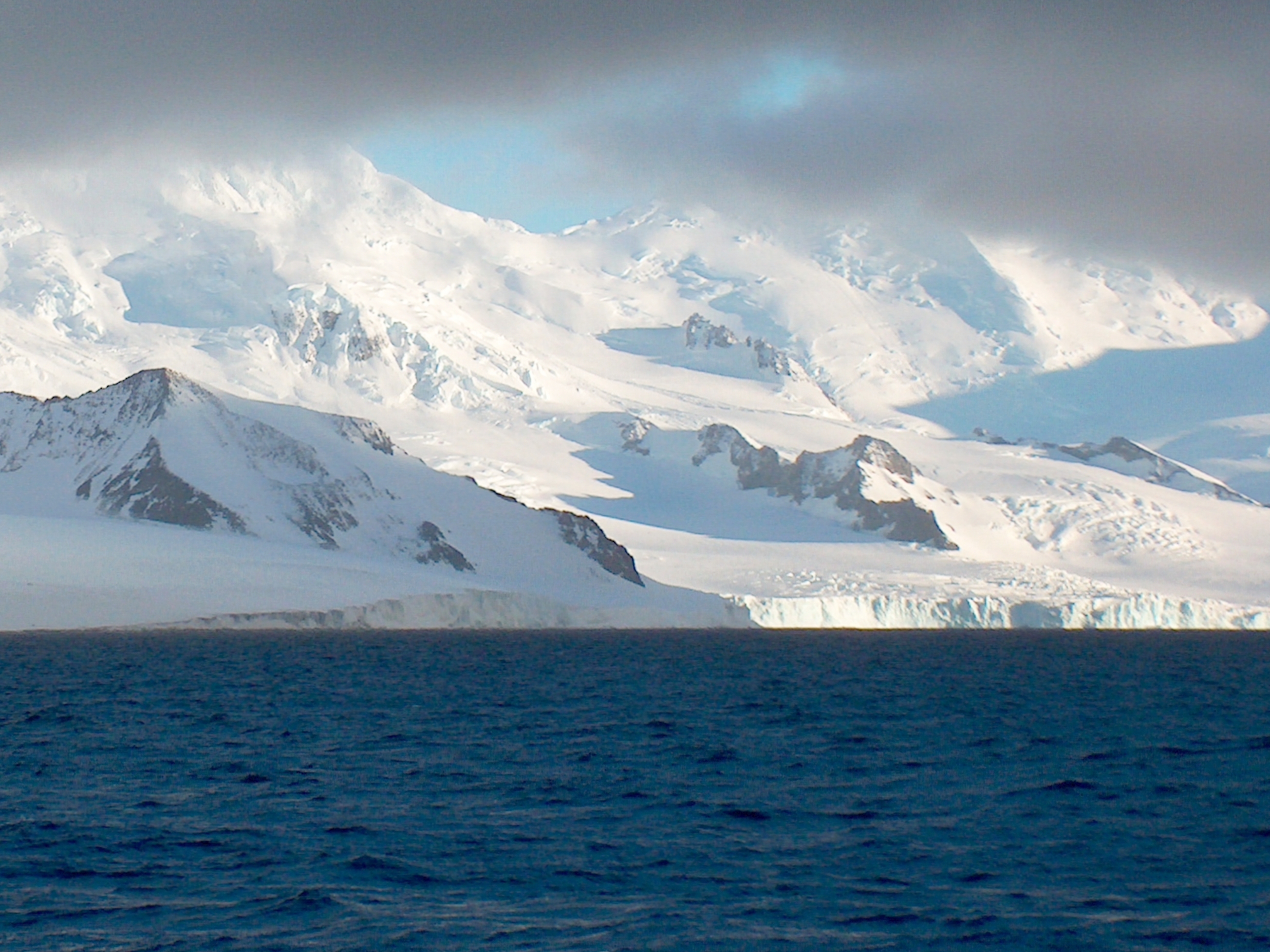
Gela Point with Chavei Cove on the right, from Bransfield Strait

Topographic map of Livingston Island and Smith Island

Chavei Cove (Bulgarian: залив Чавеи, ‘Zaliv Chavei’ \'za-liv cha-'ve-i\) is the 2.2 km wide cove indenting for 900 m the southeast coast of Rozhen Peninsula on Livingston Island in the South Shetland Islands, Antarctica, entered east of Gela Point. It is formed as a result of the retreat of Prespa Glacier in the early 21st century.

The feature is named after the settlement of Chavei in northern Bulgaria.

== Location ==
Chavei Cove is located at 62°44′10″S 60°12′10″W. Bulgarian mapping in 2009.

== Maps ==
- L.L. Ivanov. Antarctica: Livingston Island and Greenwich, Robert, Snow and Smith Islands. Scale 1:120000 topographic map. Troyan: Manfred Wörner Foundation, 2009. ISBN 978-954-92032-6-4
- L.L. Ivanov. Antarctica: Livingston Island and Smith Island. Scale 1:100000 topographic map. Manfred Wörner Foundation, 2017. ISBN 978-619-90008-3-0
- Antarctic Digital Database (ADD). Scale 1:250000 topographic map of Antarctica. Scientific Committee on Antarctic Research (SCAR). Since 1993, regularly upgraded and updated
