= Veleka Ridge =

Ridge on Livingston Island, Antarctica

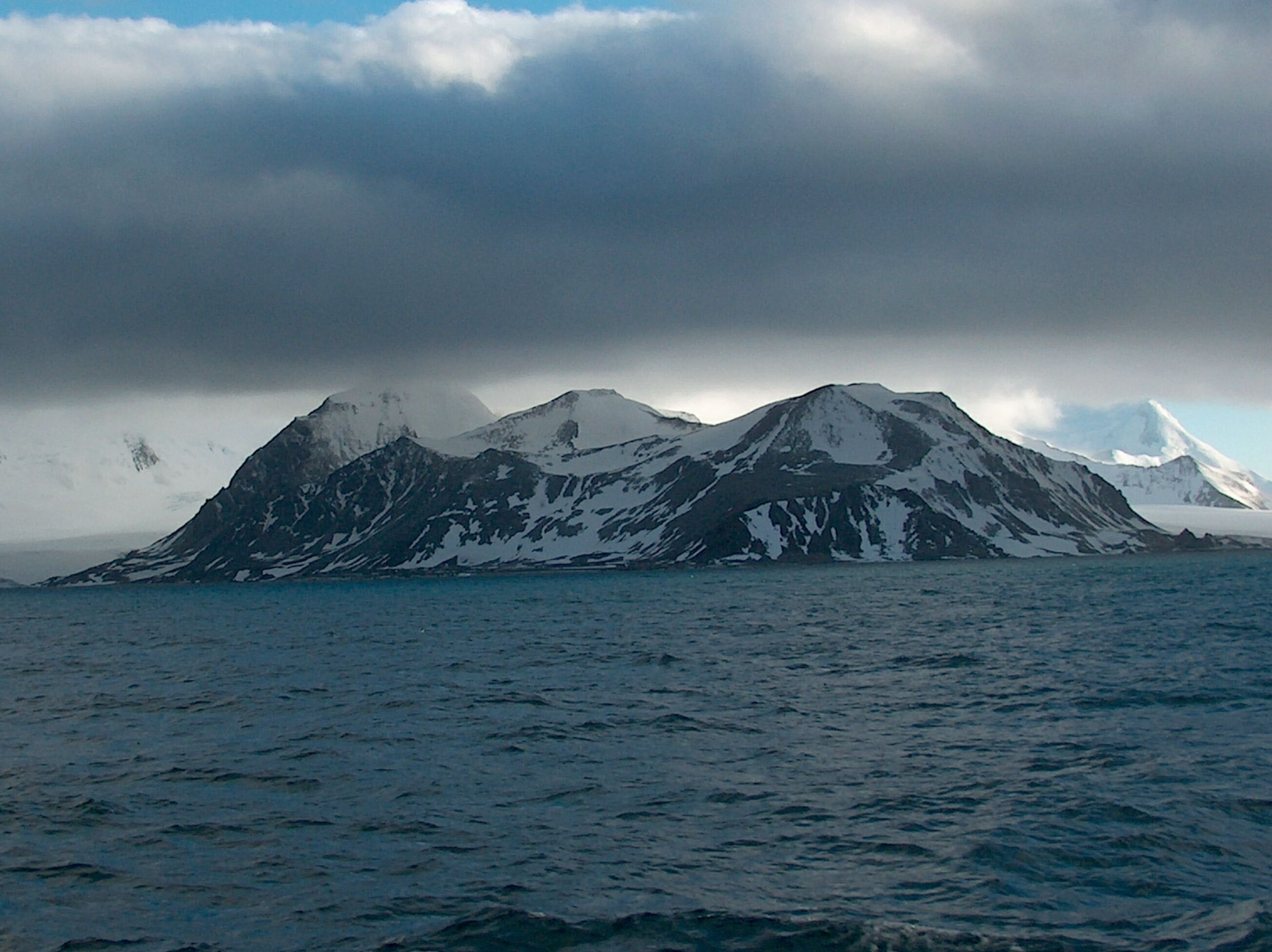
- Veleka Ridge from southwest

Highest point
- Elevation: 538 m (1,765 ft)
- Prominence: 538
- Coordinates: 62°44′32.1″S 60°18′34″W

Geography
- Location: Antarctica
- Parent range: Tangra Mountains

Location of Tangra Mountains on Livingston Island in the South Shetland Islands.

Topographic map of Livingston Island, Greenwich, Robert, Snow and Smith Islands.

Veleka Ridge is a predominantly ice-free ridge extending 3 km between Charity Glacier in the north and Botev Point in the south, and 1.3 km wide, in the southwest extremity of Friesland Ridge, Tangra Mountains on Livingston Island in the South Shetland Islands, Antarctica. The ice-free surface area of the ridge and the adjacent Arkutino Beach is 468 hectares (1,160 acres). Surmounting Tarnovo Ice Piedmont to the east, Charity Glacier to the north, Arkutino Beach to the west, and Barnard Point and Botev Point to the southwest and south respectively. The ridge's summit Veleka Peak rises to 538 m in its north extremity.

The ridge was named after the Veleka River in southeastern Bulgaria.

== Location ==
The summit Veleka Peak is located at 62°44′32.1″S 60°18′34″W which is 2.13 km south of Canetti Peak, 4.4 km southwest of St. Methodius Peak, 3.74 km west of Yambol Peak and 2.3 km north of Botev Point (British mapping in 1968, and Bulgarian in 2005 and 2009).

== Maps ==
- South Shetland Islands. Scale 1:200000 topographic map. DOS 610 Sheet W 62 60. Tolworth, UK, 1968.
- Islas Livingston y Decepción. Mapa topográfico a escala 1:100000. Madrid: Servicio Geográfico del Ejército, 1991.
- S. Soccol, D. Gildea and J. Bath. Livingston Island, Antarctica. Scale 1:100000 satellite map. The Omega Foundation, USA, 2004.
- L.L. Ivanov et al., Antarctica: Livingston Island and Greenwich Island, South Shetland Islands (from English Strait to Morton Strait, with illustrations and ice-cover distribution), 1:100000 scale topographic map, Antarctic Place-names Commission of Bulgaria, Sofia, 2005
- L.L. Ivanov. Antarctica: Livingston Island and Greenwich, Robert, Snow and Smith Islands. Scale 1:120000 topographic map. Troyan: Manfred Wörner Foundation, 2010. ISBN 978-954-92032-9-5 (First edition 2009. ISBN 978-954-92032-6-4)
- Antarctic Digital Database (ADD). Scale 1:250000 topographic map of Antarctica. Scientific Committee on Antarctic Research (SCAR), 1993–2016.
