= Needle Peak (Livingston Island) =

Mountain in Livingston Island, South Shetland Islands, Antarctica

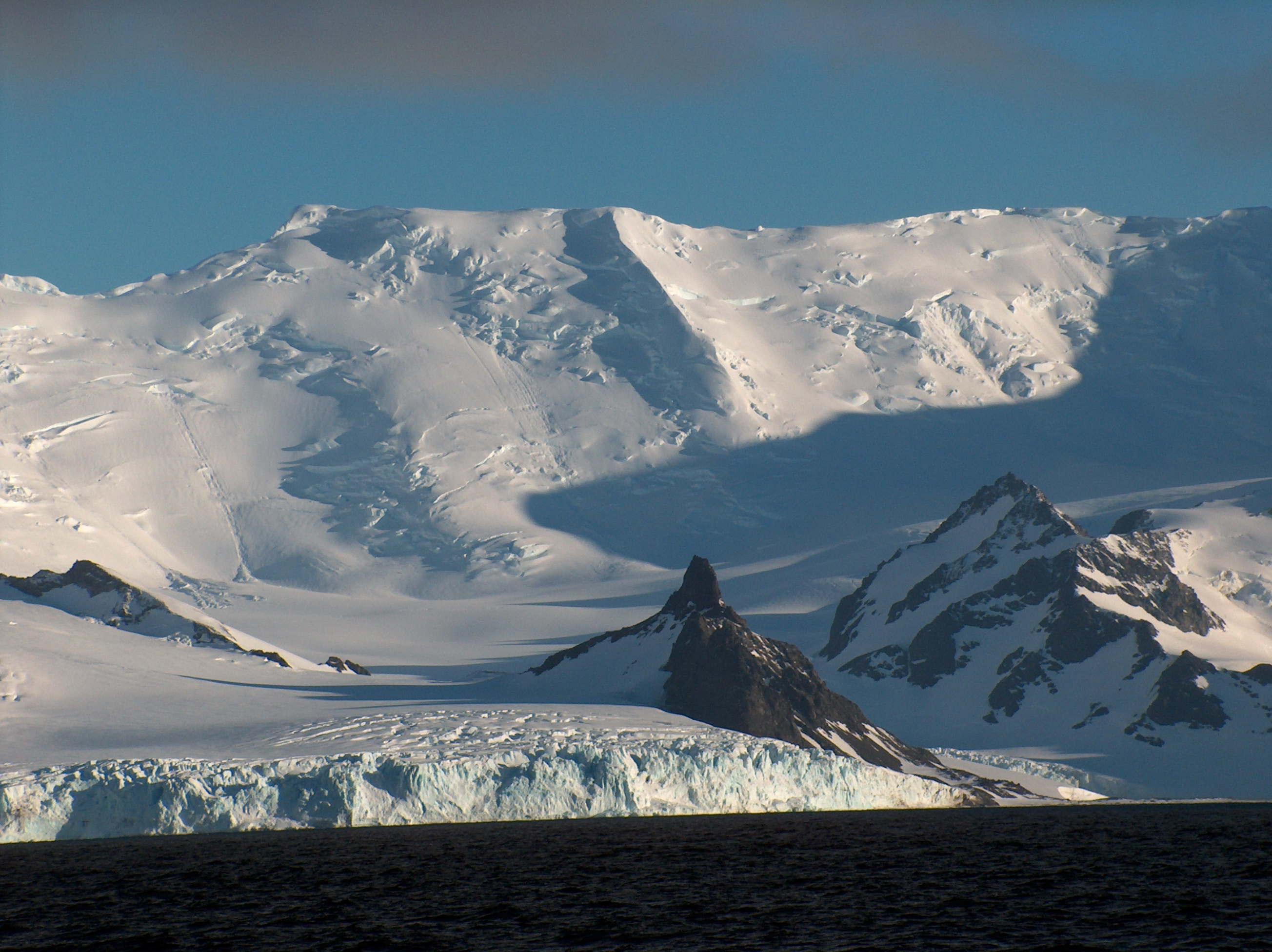
- Needle Peak from Bransfield Strait, with Peshev Ridge on the right, and Macy Glacier surmounted by Levski Peak and St. Ivan Rilski Col in the background.

Highest point
- Elevation: 370 m (1,210 ft)
- Coordinates: 62°43′35″S 60°09′58″W

Geography
- Location: Livingston Island, Antarctica

Climbing
- First ascent: unclimbed

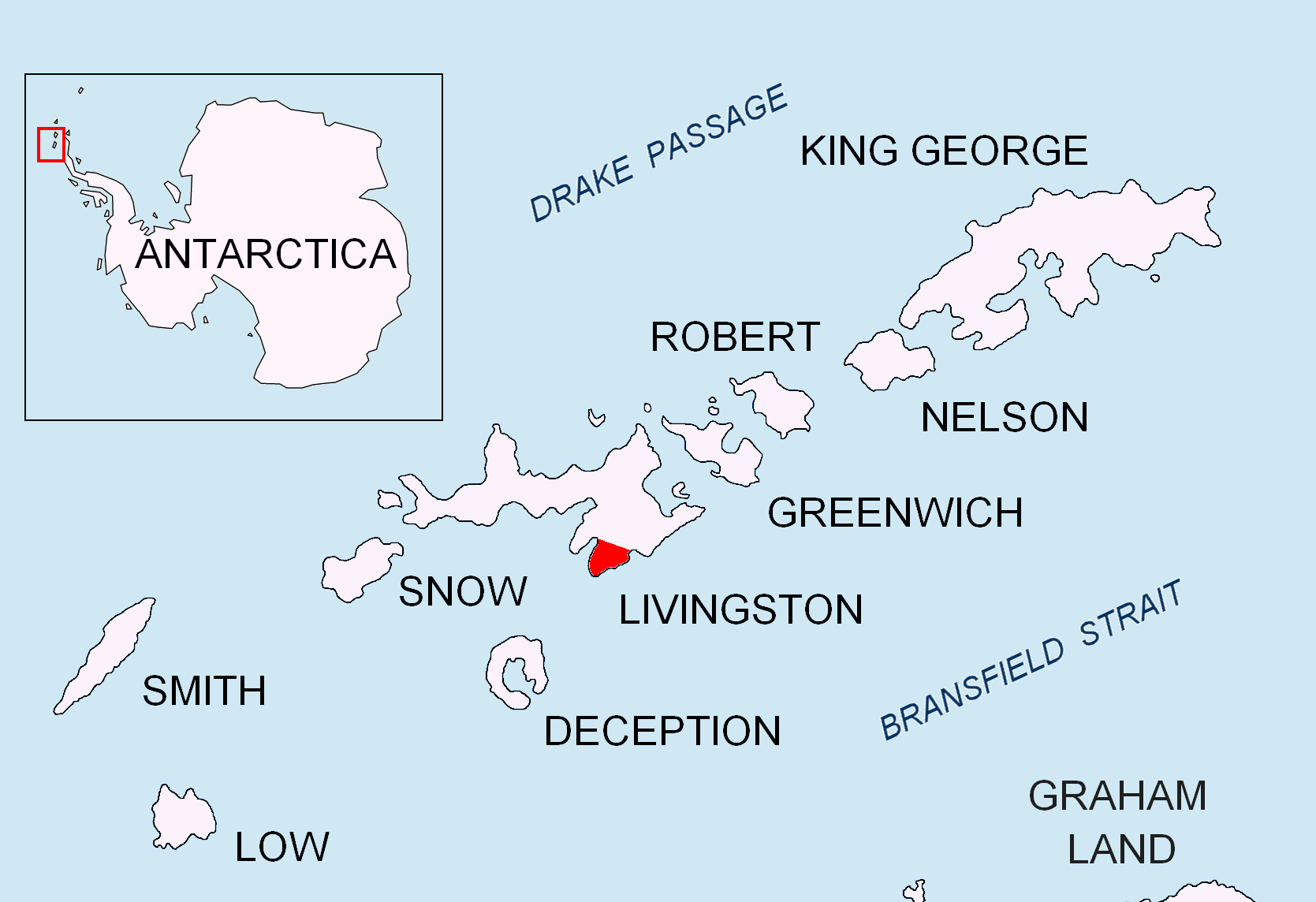
Location of Rozhen Peninsula on Livingston Island in the South Shetland Islands.

Topographic map of Livingston Island, Greenwich, Robert, Snow and Smith Islands.

Needle Peak is a sharply-pointed black peak, 370 m, standing at the west side of Brunow Bay on the south coast of Livingston Island in the South Shetland Islands. It is situated in the southeast foothills of Friesland Ridge, Tangra Mountains on Rozhen Peninsula, 1 km south-southeast of Ludogorie Peak, and surmounts Prespa Glacier on the west, Brunow Bay on the northeast, Opitsvet Lake on the east and Samuel Point on the east by south.

The feature was named ‘Barnards Peak’ on James Weddell's chart published in 1825, but the name ‘Needle Peak’, given by Discovery Investigations personnel following a 1935 survey, has succeeded it in usage. The name Barnard Point has been approved for the nearby point at the southeast side of False Bay.

== Maps ==
- L.L. Ivanov et al., Antarctica: Livingston Island and Greenwich Island, South Shetland Islands (from English Strait to Morton Strait, with illustrations and ice-cover distribution), 1:100000 scale topographic map, Antarctic Place-names Commission of Bulgaria, Sofia, 2005
- L.L. Ivanov. Antarctica: Livingston Island and Greenwich, Robert, Snow and Smith Islands. Scale 1:120000 topographic map. Troyan: Manfred Wörner Foundation, 2009. ISBN 978-954-92032-6-4
