= Yambol Peak =

Rocky peak in the South Shetland Islands, Antarctica

Location of Tangra Mountains on Livingston Island in the South Shetland Islands.

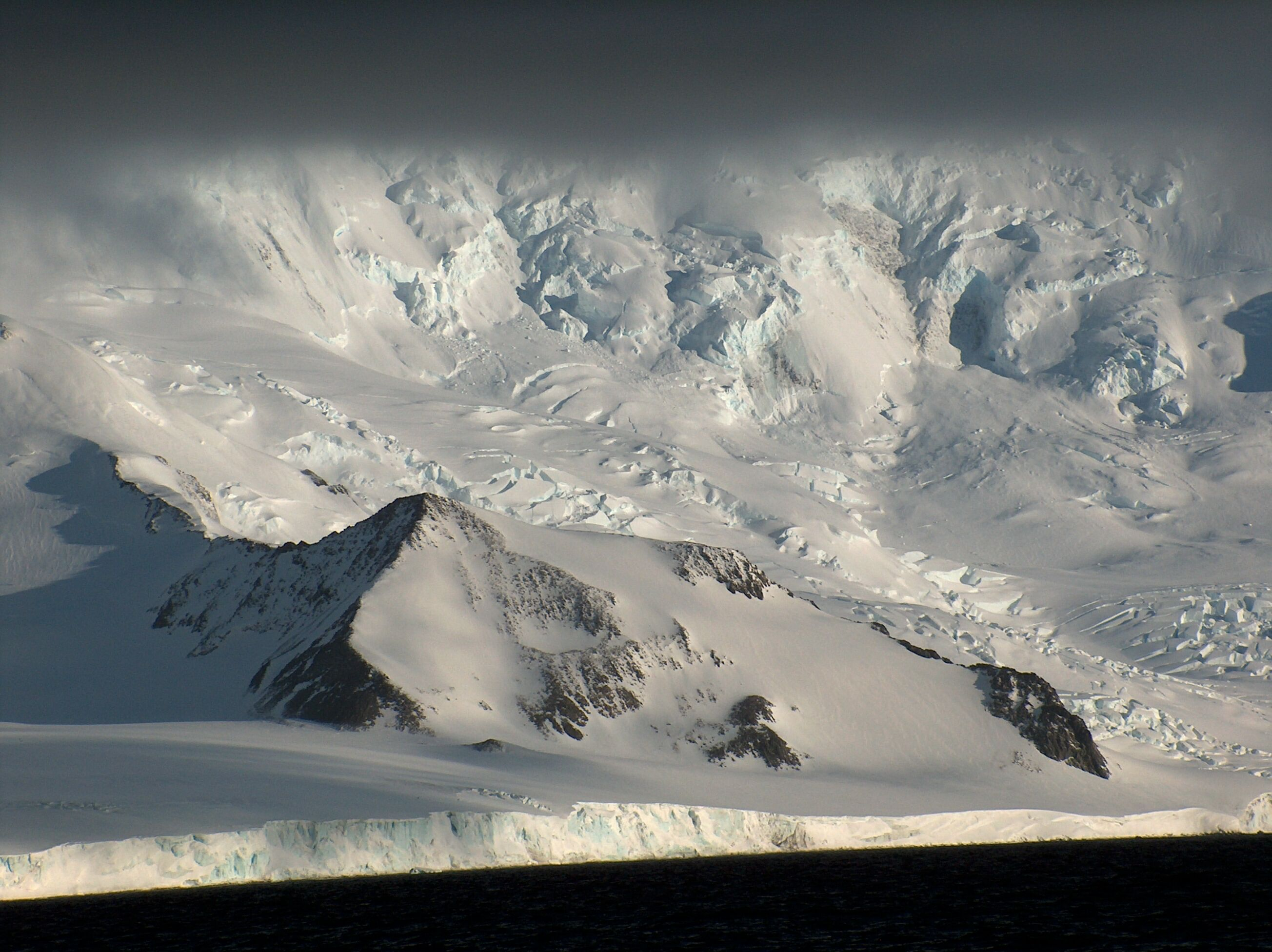
Yambol Peak from Bransfield Strait, with Prespa Glacier on the right.

Topographic map of Livingston Island and Smith Island

Yambol Peak (Bulgarian: връх Ямбол, romanized: vrah Yambol, IPA: [ˈvrɤx ˈjamboɫ]) is a rocky peak rising to 300 m in the south extremity of Friesland Ridge, Tangra Mountains on Livingston Island in the South Shetland Islands, Antarctica and overlooking Tarnovo Ice Piedmont to the west and Prespa Glacier to the northeast. The ice-free surface area of the peak is 33 hectares (82 acres). A southeastern offshoot of the peak forms Gela Point. The feature is named after the Bulgarian town of Yambol.

== Location ==
Yambol Peak is located at 62°44′25.3″S 60°14′11″W, which is 1.44 km south-southeast of Shumen Peak, 3.94 km west-southwest of Needle Peak and 4.05 km east-northeast of Botev Peak (Bulgarian topographic survey Tangra 2004/05 and mapping in 2005 and 2009).

== Maps ==
- L.L. Ivanov et al. Antarctica: Livingston Island and Greenwich Island, South Shetland Islands. Scale 1:100000 topographic map. Sofia: Antarctic Place-names Commission of Bulgaria, 2005.
- L.L. Ivanov. Antarctica: Livingston Island and Greenwich, Robert, Snow and Smith Islands. Scale 1:120000 topographic map. Troyan: Manfred Wörner Foundation, 2010. ISBN 978-954-92032-9-5 (First edition 2009. ISBN 978-954-92032-6-4)
- Antarctic Digital Database (ADD). Scale 1:250000 topographic map of Antarctica. Scientific Committee on Antarctic Research (SCAR). Since 1993, regularly updated.
- L.L. Ivanov. Antarctica: Livingston Island and Smith Island. Scale 1:100000 topographic map. Manfred Wörner Foundation, 2017. ISBN 978-619-90008-3-0
