= Samuel Point =

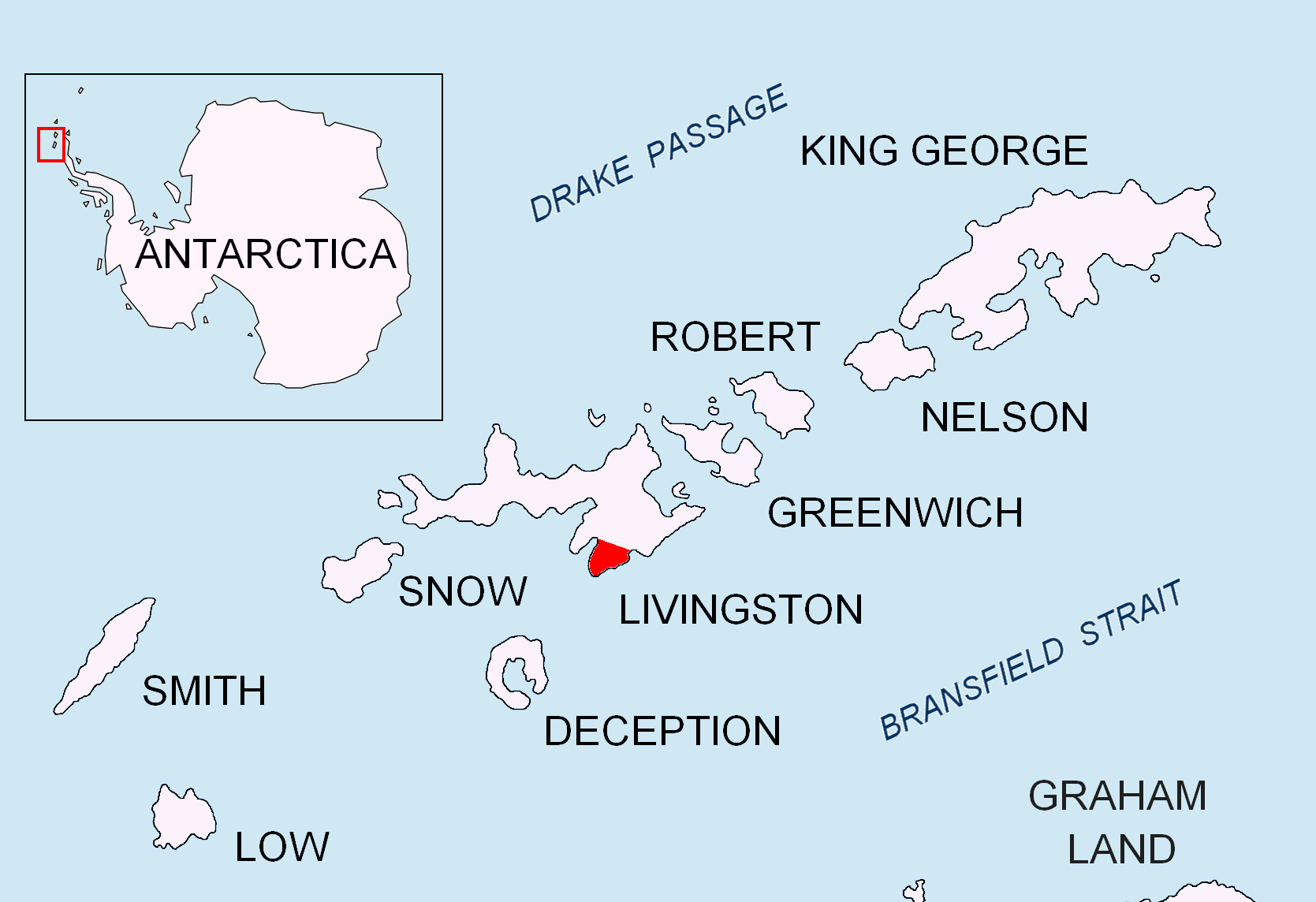
Location of Rozhen Peninsula on Livingston Island in the South Shetland Islands

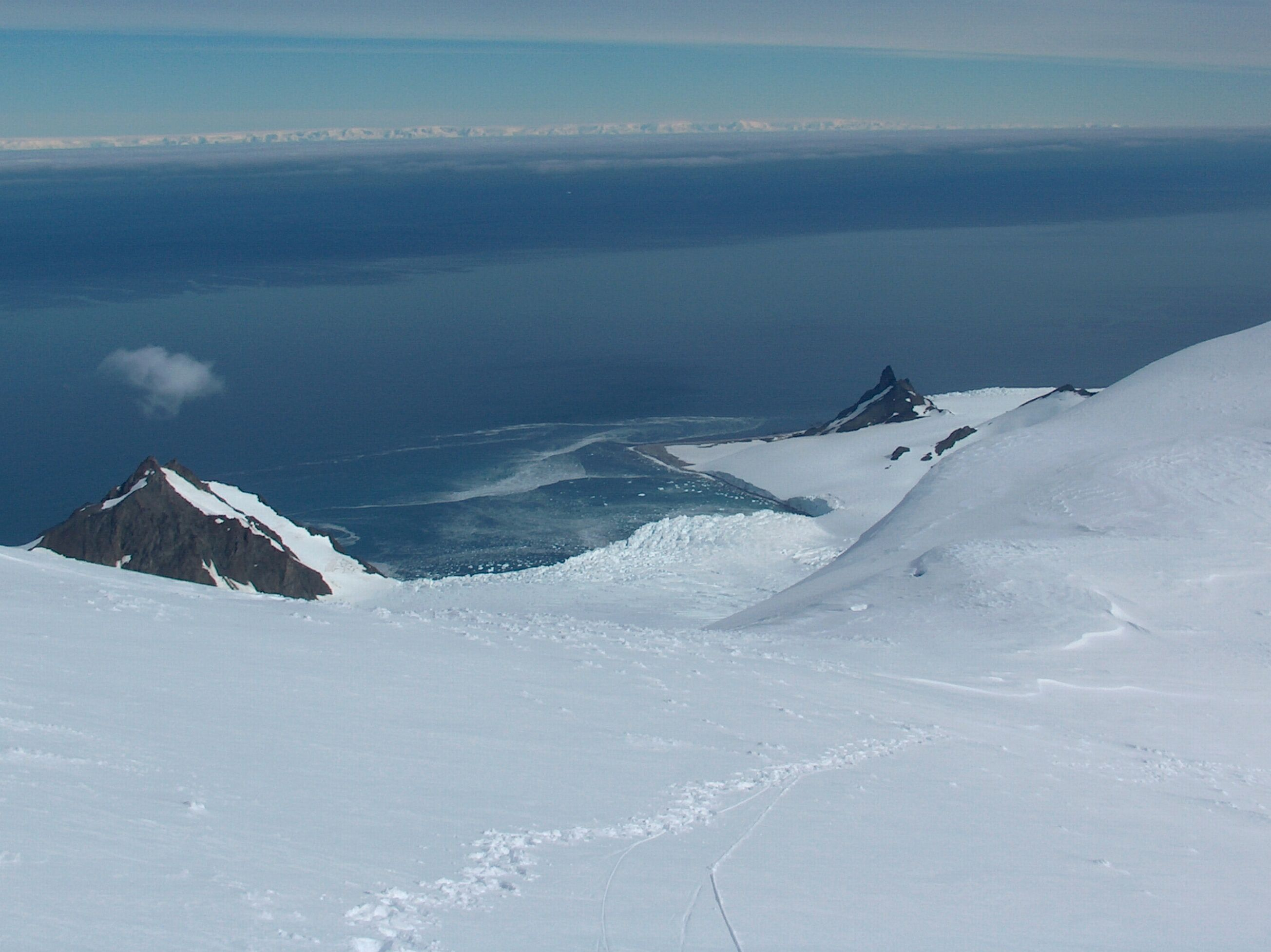
Samuel Point (on the right) and Brunow Bay from Catalunyan Saddle in Tangra Mountains, with Bransfield Strait and Antarctic Peninsula in the background

Topographic map of Livingston Island, Greenwich, Robert, Snow and Smith Islands

Samuel Point (Nos Samuil \'nos sa-mu-'il\) is on the coast of Bransfield Strait forming the southwest side of the entrance to Brunow Bay on Livingston Island in the South Shetland Islands, Antarctica. The point is situated on the east side of Rozhen Peninsula, surmounted by Needle Peak (370 m), a conspicuous offshoot of Friesland Ridge. Opitsvet Lake lies at the point's base.

The feature is named after Czar Samuil of Bulgaria, 980-1014 AD.

== Location ==
The point is located at 62°43′42″S 60°08′52″W, which is 9.3 km east-northeast of Botev Point, and 5.55 km west-southwest of Aytos Point (UK Directorate of Overseas Surveys mapping in 1968, and Bulgarian mapping in 2005 and 2009).

== Maps ==
- L.L. Ivanov et al. Antarctica: Livingston Island and Greenwich Island, South Shetland Islands. Scale 1:100000 topographic map. Sofia: Antarctic Place-names Commission of Bulgaria, 2005.
- L.L. Ivanov. Antarctica: Livingston Island and Greenwich, Robert, Snow and Smith Islands. Scale 1:120000 topographic map. Troyan: Manfred Wörner Foundation, 2009. ISBN 978-954-92032-6-4
