= Barnard Point =

Headland in Antarctica

Coordinates: 62°45′29″S 60°20′19″W

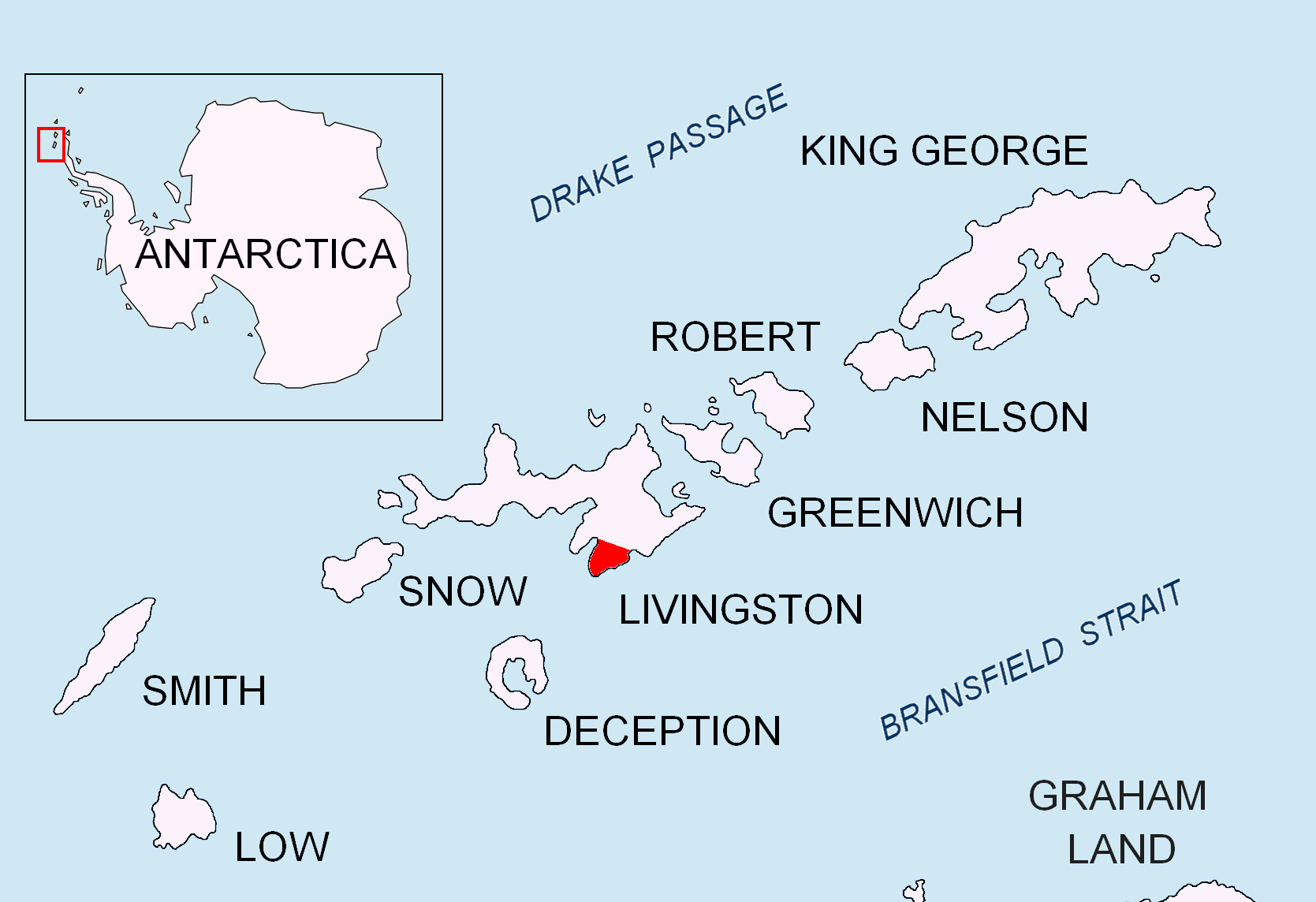
Location of Rozhen Peninsula in the South Shetland Islands

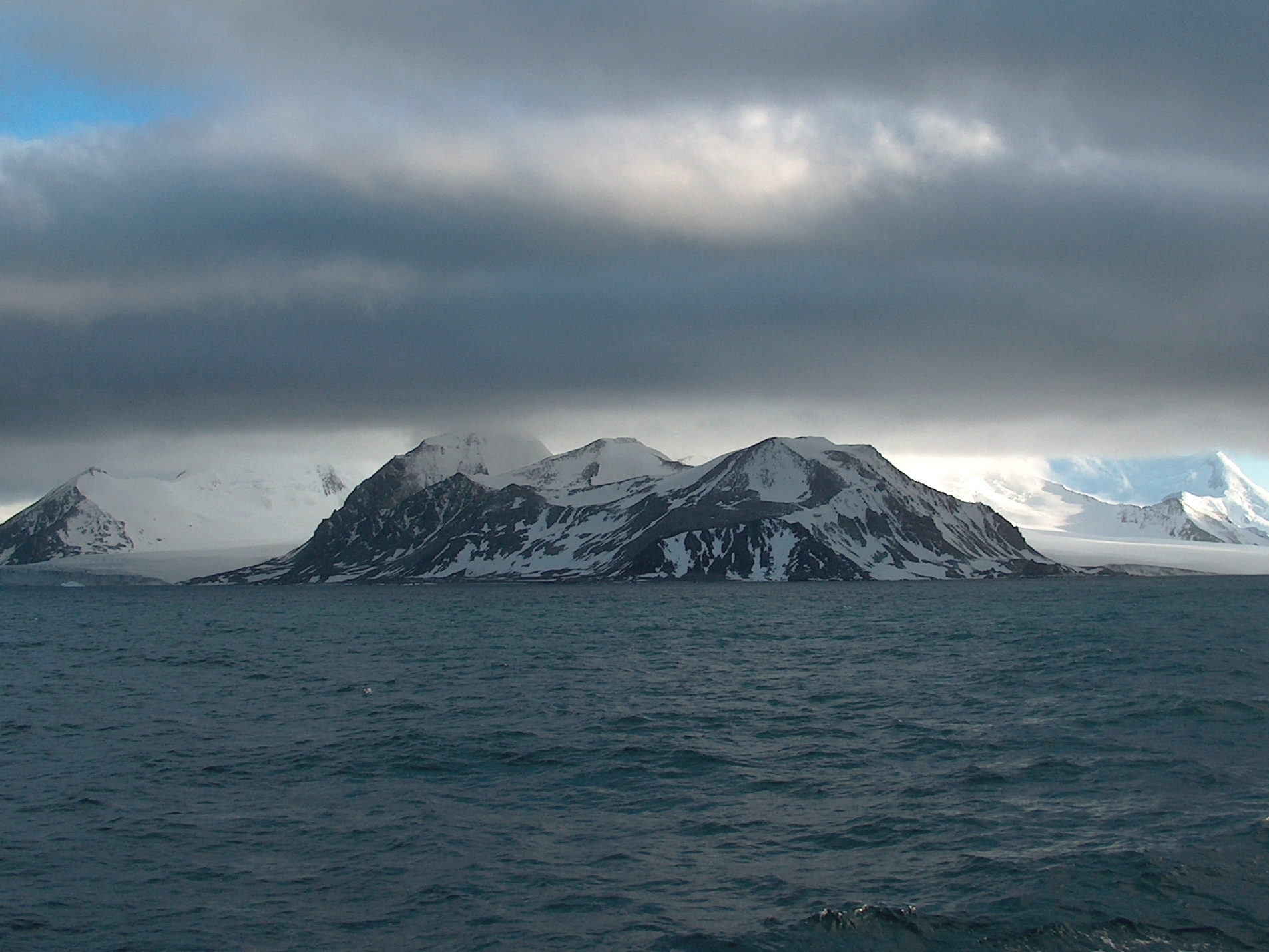
Barnard Point from Smolensk Strait

Topographic map of Livingston Island.

Barnard Point is a headland which marks the south-east side of the entrance to False Bay on the south side of Livingston Island in the South Shetland Islands, Antarctica. It is situated on Rozhen Peninsula, 1.5 km (1 mi) north-north-west of Botev Point and 6.6 km (4 mi) south-east of Miers Bluff (British mapping in 1968, and Bulgarian in 2005 and 2009).

== History ==
The point was known to sealers as early as 1822. The name was applied about a century later, probably after Mount Barnard (now Mount Friesland) which surmounts it to the north-east. Charles H. Barnard, captain of the ship Charity of New York, was a sealer in the South Shetlands in 1820–21.

== Important Bird Area ==
The site has been identified as an Important Bird Area (IBA) by BirdLife International because it supports a large breeding colony of chinstrap penguins (13,000 pairs), as well as about 30 pairs of southern giant petrels. The 175 ha IBA comprises the ice-free area at the point, which rises to a height of over 250 m at its easternmost extent.

== Maps ==
- L.L. Ivanov et al. Antarctica: Livingston Island and Greenwich Island, South Shetland Islands. Scale 1:100000 topographic map. Sofia: Antarctic Place-names Commission of Bulgaria, 2005.
- L.L. Ivanov. Antarctica: Livingston Island and Greenwich, Robert, Snow and Smith Islands. Scale 1:120000 topographic map. Troyan: Manfred Wörner Foundation, 2009. ISBN 978-954-92032-6-4
