= Brunow Bay =

Location of Brunow Bay in Antarctica

Location of Livingston Island in the South Shetland Islands.

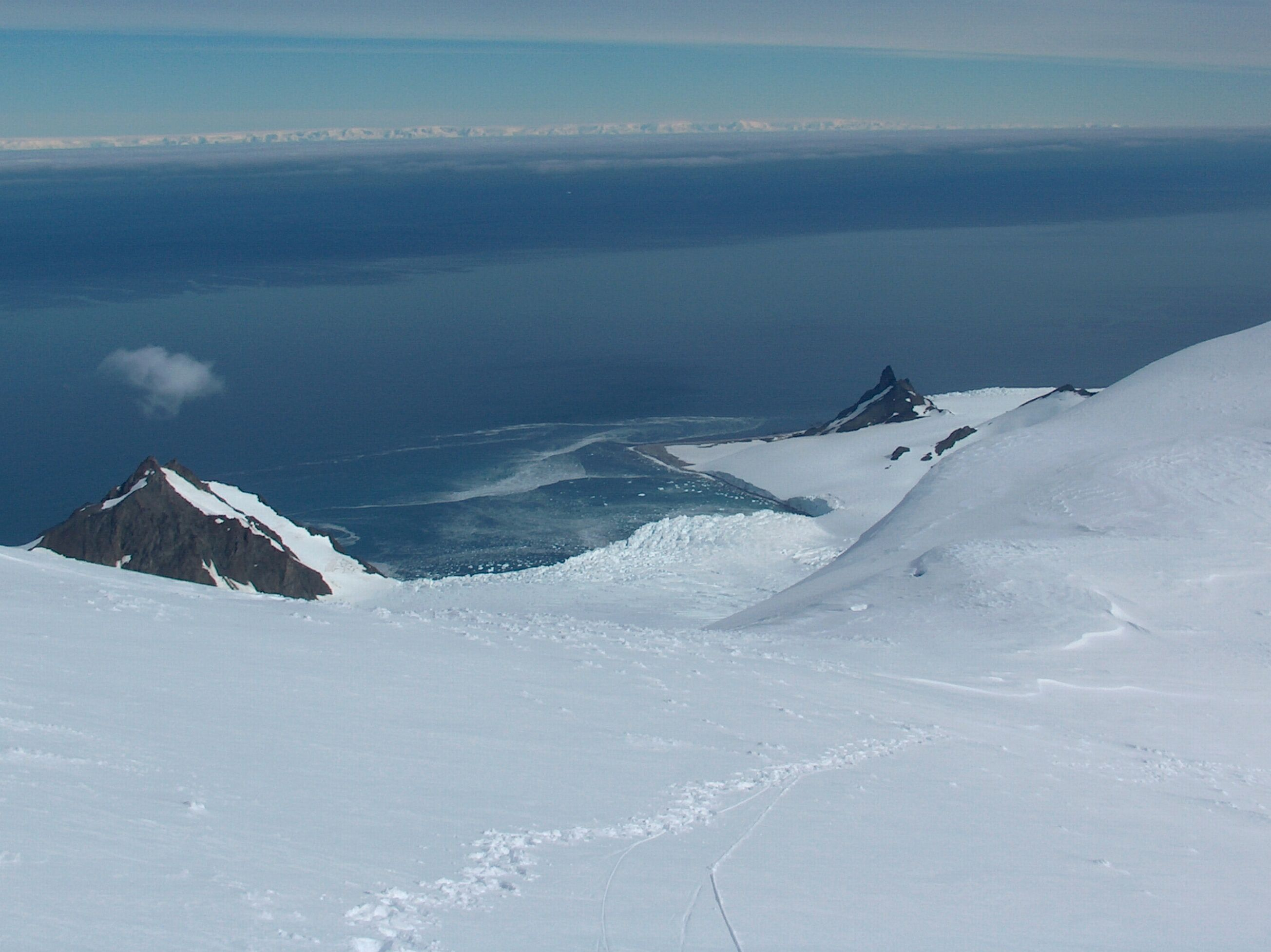
Brunow Bay from Catalunyan Saddle, Tangra Mountains, with Bransfield Strait and Antarctic Peninsula in the background.

Topographic map of Livingston Island.

Brunow Bay is a 2.33 km wide bay indenting for 1.5 km the southeast side of Livingston Island in the South Shetland Islands, Antarctica. The bay is entered between Samuel Point and Vazov Point, and has its northwestern coast formed by the terminus of Macy Glacier.

The feature is named by the UK-APC in 1958 for Benjamin J. Brunow, Master of the schooner Henry, one of James Byers’ fleet of American sealers from New York which visited the South Shetland Islands in 1820–21, operating from Yankee Harbor in nearby Greenwich Island.

== Location ==
The bay's midpoint is located at 62°43′00″S 60°08′10″W (British mapping in 1968, Bulgarian in 2005 and 2009).

== Maps ==
- South Shetland Islands. Scale 1:200000 topographic map No. 5657. DOS 610 – W 62 60. Tolworth, UK, 1968.
- Islas Livingston y Decepción. Mapa topográfico a escala 1:100000. Madrid: Servicio Geográfico del Ejército, 1991.
- L.L. Ivanov et al. Antarctica: Livingston Island and Greenwich Island, South Shetland Islands. Scale 1:100000 topographic map. Sofia: Antarctic Place-names Commission of Bulgaria, 2005.
- L.L. Ivanov. Antarctica: Livingston Island and Greenwich, Robert, Snow and Smith Islands. Scale 1:120000 topographic map. Troyan: Manfred Wörner Foundation, 2009. ISBN 978-954-92032-6-4
- Antarctic Digital Database (ADD). Scale 1:250000 topographic map of Antarctica. Scientific Committee on Antarctic Research (SCAR), 1993–2016.
