= St. Naum Peak =

560m peak in the South Shetland Islands, Antarctica

Location of Tangra Mountains on Livingston Island in the South Shetland Islands.

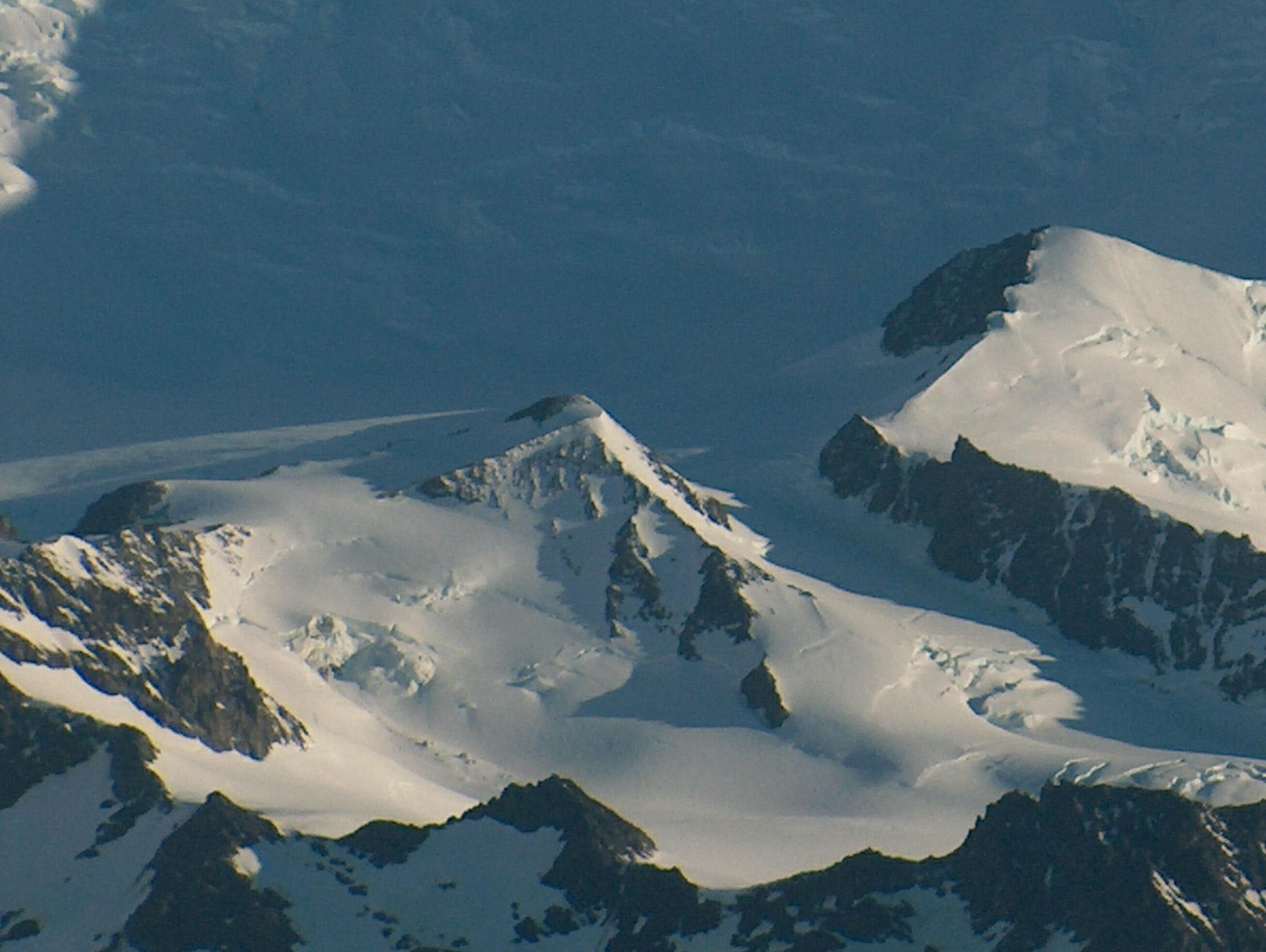
St. Naum Peak from Bransfield Strait, with Starosel Gate, Balchik Ridge and Silistra Knoll to the right and Vazov Rock in the foreground.

Topographic map of Livingston Island and Smith Island

St. Naum Peak (Bulgarian: връх Св. Наум, romanized: vrah Sv. Naum, IPA: [ˈvrɤx svɛˈti nɐˈum]) is a rocky peak of elevation 560 m in the east extremity of Peshev Ridge, Tangra Mountains, Livingston Island in the South Shetland Islands, Antarctica. Separated from Balchik Ridge and Silistra Knoll to the east by Starosel Gate, and surmounting Macy Glacier to the north and Boyana Glacier to the south.

The peak is named after the Bulgarian scholar St. Naum of Preslav and Ohrid (—910 AD), brother of St. Kliment Ohridski and student of St. Cyril and St. Methodius who worked under the auspices of Czar Boris I of Bulgaria both in Veliki Preslav and Devol.

== Location ==
The peak is located at 62°41′37.8″S 60°06′19″W, which is 1.2 km east-northeast of Peshev Peak, 790 m west-southwest of Silistra Knoll, and 3.46 km south of Levski Peak (Bulgarian topographic survey Tangra 2004/05, and mapping in 2005 and 2009).

== Maps ==
- L.L. Ivanov et al. Antarctica: Livingston Island and Greenwich Island, South Shetland Islands. Scale 1:100000 topographic map. Sofia: Antarctic Place-names Commission of Bulgaria, 2005.
- L.L. Ivanov. Antarctica: Livingston Island and Greenwich, Robert, Snow and Smith Islands. Scale 1:120000 topographic map. Troyan: Manfred Wörner Foundation, 2009. ISBN 978-954-92032-6-4
- L.L. Ivanov. Antarctica: Livingston Island and Smith Island. Scale 1:100000 topographic map. Manfred Wörner Foundation, 2017. ISBN 978-619-90008-3-0
