= Serdica Peak =

1,200m peak in the South Shetland Islands, Antarctica

Location of Tangra Mountains on Livingston Island in the South Shetland Islands

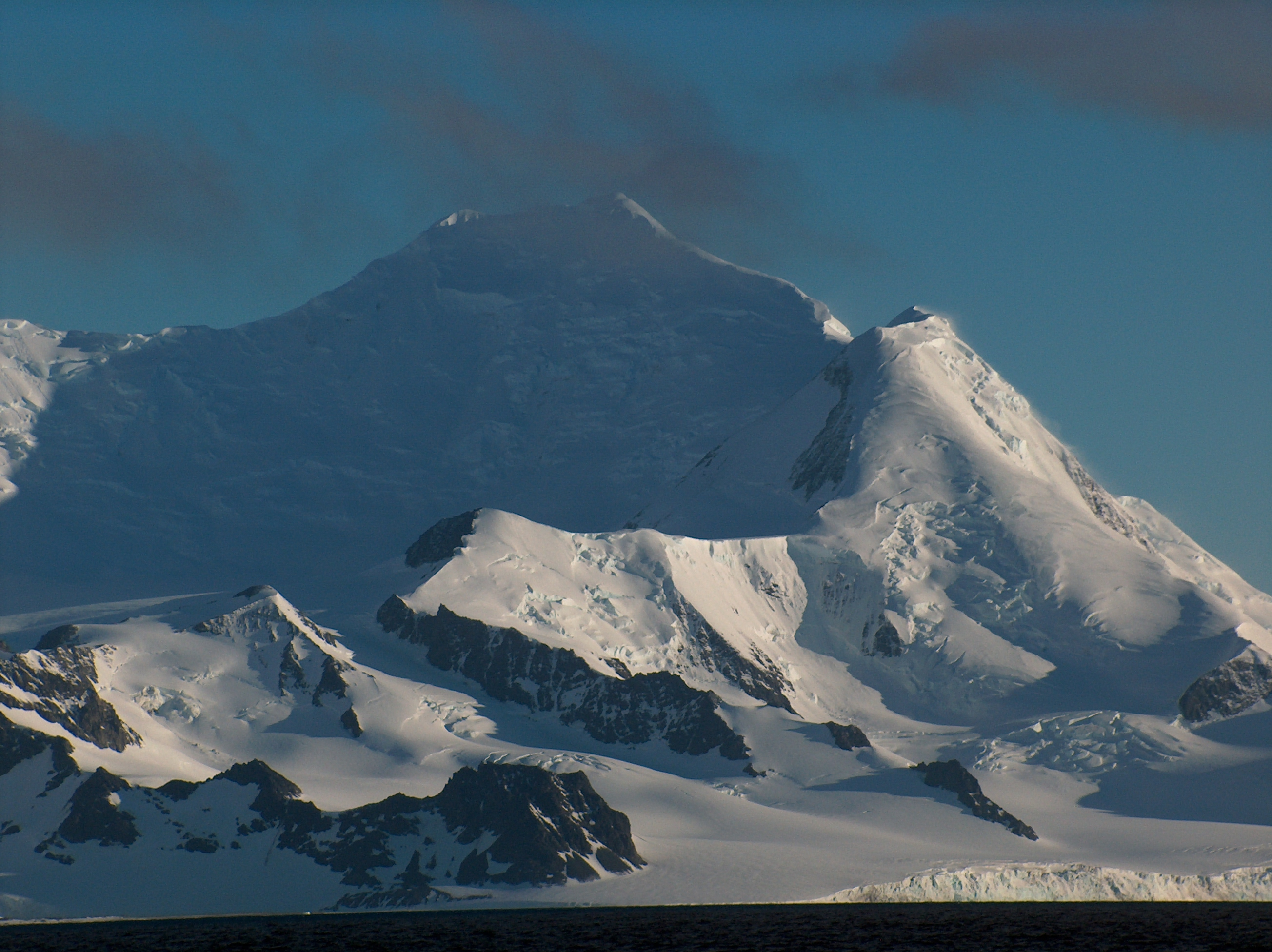
Serdica Peak (on the right) from Bransfield Strait, with Silistra Knoll to the left, Boyana Glacier and Vazov Rock in the foreground, and Great Needle Peak in the background

Topographic map of Livingston Island

Serdica Peak (Bulgarian: връх Сердика, romanized: vrah Serdika, IPA: [ˈvrɤx ˈsɛrdikɐ]) rises to approximately 1,200m in Levski Ridge, Tangra Mountains, Livingston Island in the South Shetland Islands, Antarctica. Linked to Silistra Knoll to the west-southwest by Kotel Gap. Surmounting Macy Glacier to the west, Boyana Glacier to the southwest, and Srebarna Glacier to the southeast.

Serdica is the ancient name of Sofia, Bulgaria.

== Location ==
The peak is located at 62°40′52.5″S 60°03′22″W, which is 1.29 km south of the Great Needle Peak (Pico Falsa Aguja) and 2.83 km north of Aytos Point formed by an offshoot of the peak (Bulgarian mapping in 2005 and 2009).

== Maps ==
- South Shetland Islands. Scale 1:200000 topographic map. DOS 610 Sheet W 62 60. Tolworth, UK, 1968.
- Islas Livingston y Decepción. Mapa topográfico a escala 1:100000. Madrid: Servicio Geográfico del Ejército, 1991.
- S. Soccol, D. Gildea and J. Bath. Livingston Island, Antarctica. Scale 1:100000 satellite map. The Omega Foundation, USA, 2004.
- L.L. Ivanov et al., Antarctica: Livingston Island and Greenwich Island, South Shetland Islands (from English Strait to Morton Strait, with illustrations and ice-cover distribution), 1:100000 scale topographic map, Antarctic Place-names Commission of Bulgaria, Sofia, 2005
- L.L. Ivanov. Antarctica: Livingston Island and Greenwich, Robert, Snow and Smith Islands. Scale 1:120000 topographic map. Troyan: Manfred Wörner Foundation, 2010. ISBN 978-954-92032-9-5 (First edition 2009. ISBN 978-954-92032-6-4)
- Antarctic Digital Database (ADD). Scale 1:250000 topographic map of Antarctica. Scientific Committee on Antarctic Research (SCAR), 1993–2016.
- A. Kamburov and L. Ivanov. Bowles Ridge and Central Tangra Mountains: Livingston Island, Antarctica. Scale 1:25000 map. Sofia: Manfred Wörner Foundation, 2023. ISBN 978-619-90008-6-1
