= Balchik Ridge =

Narrow ridge in the South Shetland Islands, Antarctica

Location of Tangra Mountains on Livingston Island in the South Shetland Islands.

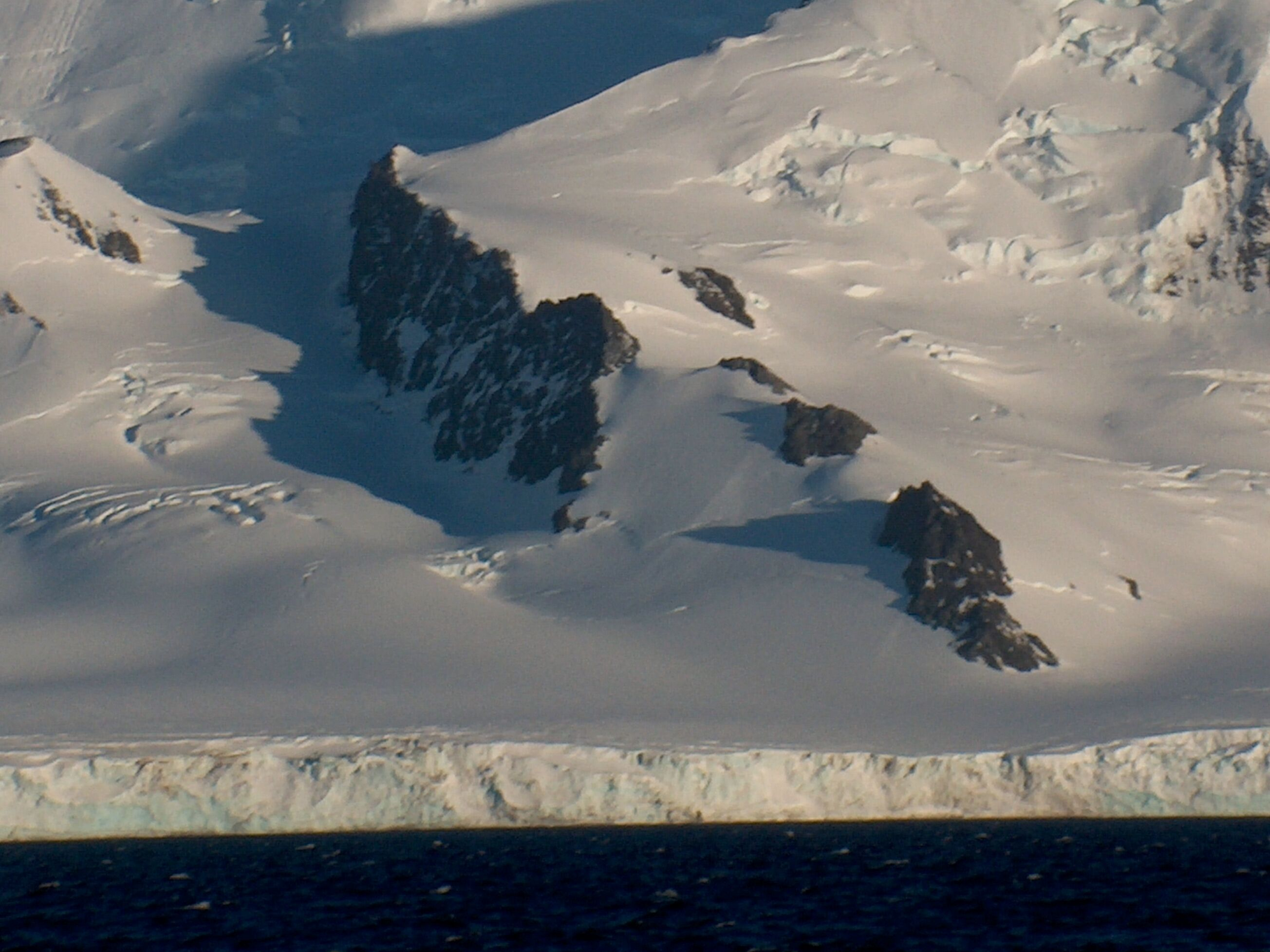
Balchik Ridge from Bransfield Strait.

Topographic map of Livingston Island, Greenwich, Robert, Snow and Smith Islands.

Balchik Ridge (Balchishki Rid \bal-'chish-ki 'rid\) is a 1.3 km long narrow ridge in Tangra Mountains on Livingston Island in the South Shetland Islands, Antarctica with a highest point of 550m. The ridge adjoins the col linking Silistra Knoll and Peshev Ridge and surmounts Boyana Glacier to the southwest, south and east. The ridge was named after the Bulgarian town of Balchik.

== Location ==
The midpoint of the ridge is at 62°41′53″S 60°05′45″W which is 870m south-southeast of Silistra Knoll, 1.51 km east of Peshev Peak, 2 km north-northeast of Vazov Point, 2.53 km west-northwest of Aytos Point and 1.7 km west of Christoff Cliff. The ridge was mapped by Bulgaria in 2005.

== See also ==
- List of Bulgarian toponyms in Antarctica
- Antarctic Place-names Commission

== Maps ==
- L.L. Ivanov et al. Antarctica: Livingston Island and Greenwich Island, South Shetland Islands. Scale 1:100000 topographic map. Sofia: Antarctic Place-names Commission of Bulgaria, 2005.
- L.L. Ivanov. Antarctica: Livingston Island and Greenwich, Robert, Snow and Smith Islands. Scale 1:120000 topographic map. Troyan: Manfred Wörner Foundation, 2009.
