= Dimitar Peshev =

Bulgarian politician

- Димитър Пешев
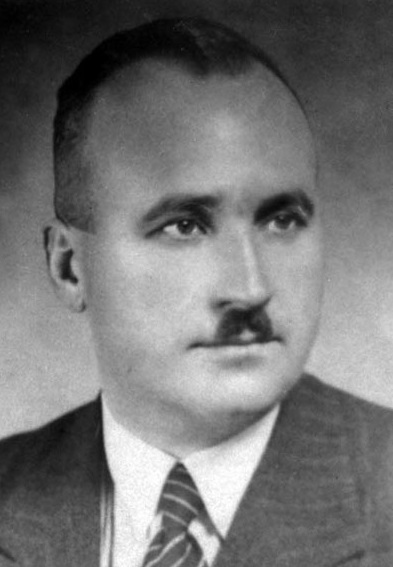
- Peshev in 1937
- Born: Dimitar Yosifov Peshev; 25 June 1894; Kyustendil, Principality of Bulgaria
- Died: 20 February 1973 (aged 78); Sofia, People's Republic of Bulgaria

Dimitar Yosifov Peshev (Bulgarian: Димитър Йосифов Пешев; 25 June 1894 – 20 February 1973) was the Deputy Speaker of the National Assembly of Bulgaria and Minister of Justice (1935–1936), before World War II. He rebelled against the pro-Nazi cabinet and prevented the deportation of Bulgaria's 48,000 Jews. He was bestowed the title of "Righteous Among the Nations".

== Context of Bulgaria during World War II ==
Tsar Boris III of Bulgaria joined in an alliance with Adolf Hitler in 1940, agreeing to his anti-Semitic course. In January 1941, the parliament (National Assembly or Narodno Sabranie) of Bulgaria put into effect the "Law for the protection of the nation", which was modeled upon the Nuremberg Laws. Dimitar Peshev, then vice president of the Sabranie, did not object to the Bulgarian alliance with Nazi Germany when King Boris III joined Hitler’s Axis. He did not object to drafting anti-Jewish laws (Law for Protection of the Nation Закон за защита на нацията ). In 1940, he voted in favor of the Law to Protect the Nation . These laws depicted the Jews as the country's most vile enemies and defined a Jew as anybody who had at least one Jewish parent. Under the law, Jews were no longer eligible for Bulgarian citizenship, had to change their last names if they resembled anything Bulgarian, and could not intermarry with non-Jews. A strict quota of less than 1% was instituted dictating how many Jews could study in universities, and Jews could not hold employment in the majority of occupations. The majority of Bulgarians, including many members of parliament, the Orthodox Church, writers, artists, lawyers, and other members of the intelligentsia, opposed the law.

The Bulgarian government signed an agreement declaring that, on 10 March 1943, all of Bulgaria's 48,000 Jews would be deported from the Kyustendil railway station and sent to death camps in German-occupied Poland. This deportation was organized under the leadership of Theodor Dannecker, an SS officer very close to Eichmann. Jews in parts of Greece and Yugoslavia occupied by Bulgaria would also be rounded up and deported.

== Personal background ==
Born in 1894 in Kyustendil to an affluent family, Dimitar Peshev had studied languages in Saloniki and law in Sofia. He fought in World War I on the southern front. A year after the war, he completed his law studies and became a judge. He was known in Parliament and politics as being an honest and honorable man and, in 1938, won the position of Deputy Speaker. His main interests were in safeguarding human rights and the Constitution. He was strongly disliked by Prime Minister Bogdan Filov.

== Role in preventing the Jewish deportation ==
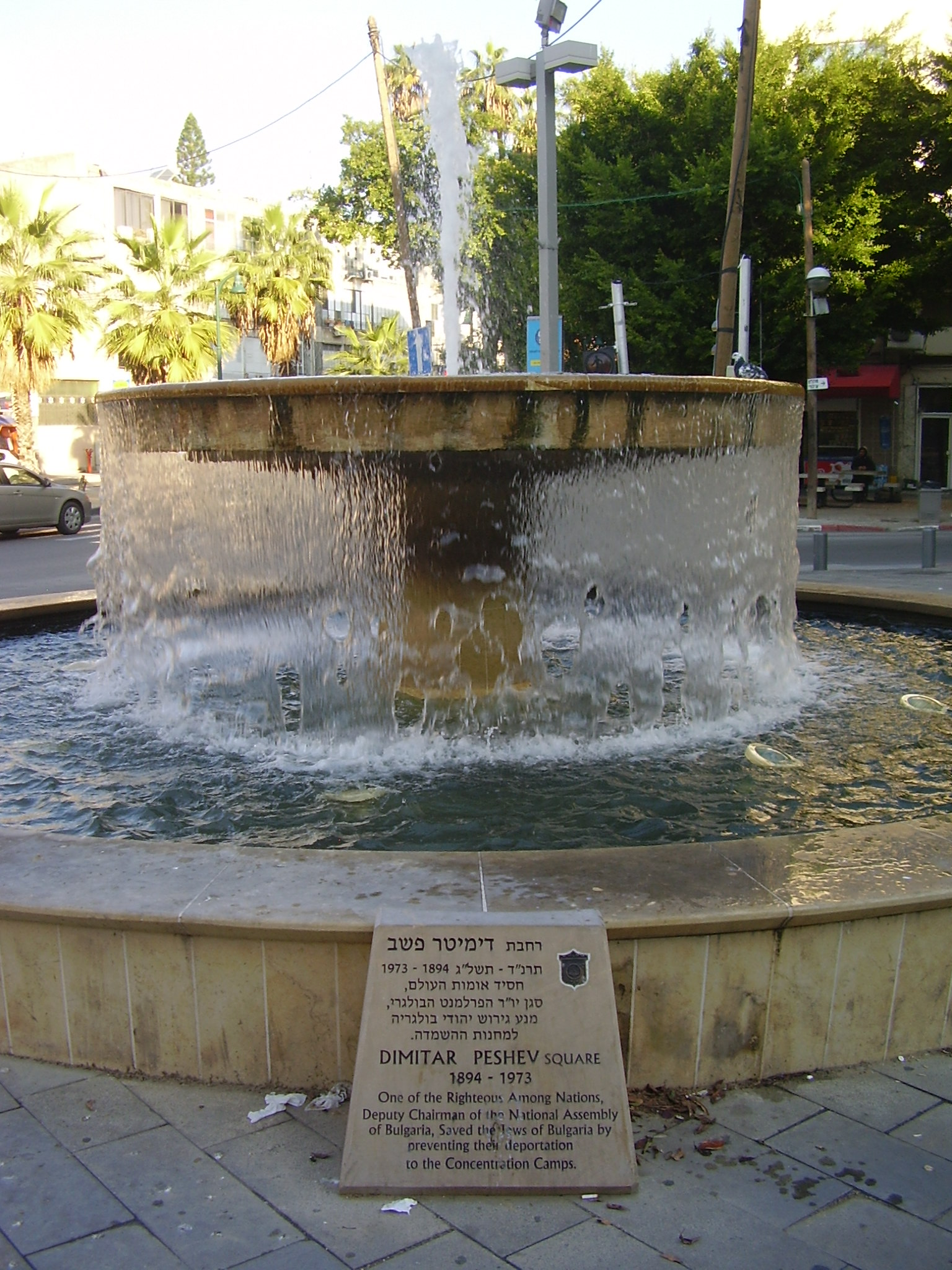
Dimitar Peshev Square in Jaffa

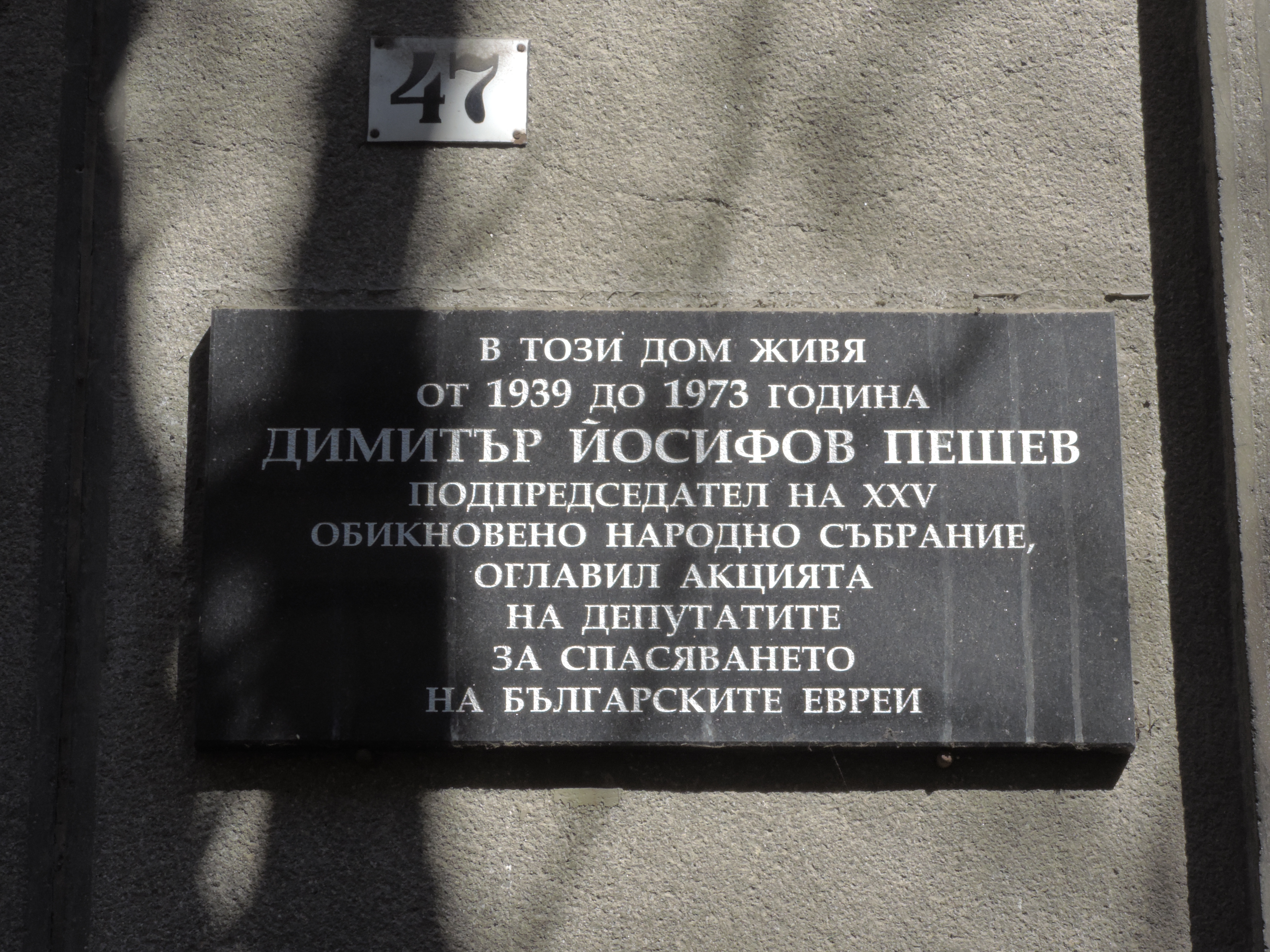
The memorial plaque on the house in Sofia, where Peshev lived from 1939 to 1973

Peshev was a good friend of Bulgaria's Jewish community. However, he had not objected to the institution of the "Law for the Defense of the Nation" (ZZN), an anti-Jewish bill. At the beginning of March 1943, the Jews of Kyustendil were ordered by the Commissariat on the Jewish Issues to leave their homes with only a few belongings. Understanding the implications of this order, the citizens of Kyustendil appointed a delegation to ask the government to repeal this evacuation order. On 8 March 1943 the delegation marched into Dimitar Peshev's office. One of the delegates, Peshev's Jewish friend, Jakob Baruch, informed him of the government's plan to deport the Jews. At first, Peshev thought Baruch's words to be untrue until he telephoned several high government officials who confirmed the rumor. By the morning of 9 March, Peshev had made up his mind to halt the deportations.

Peshev tried several times to see Bogdan Filov, but the prime minister refused. Next, he and his close friend and colleague, Petar Mihalev, went to see Interior Minister Petar Gabrovski, insisting that he cancel the deportations. After much persuasion, Gabrovski finally called the governor of Kyustendil and instructed him to stop preparations for the Jewish deportations. By 5:30 p.m. on 9 March the order had been canceled. However, the order did not reach all the Bulgarian cities on time, and, on the morning of 10 March, Bulgarian police began to round up Jews in Thrace and Macedonia. Almost all of the Jews in Bulgarian-occupied Thrace (some 4,000) were arrested and surrendered to the Germans, who then deported them to their deaths at Treblinka. Another group of about 1,200 Thrace Jews was moved to Salonika and then sent to Auschwitz. At the same time, all of the Jews of Macedonia were rounded up by the Bulgarian authorities; all but 165 were deported to Treblinka.

Once Peshev learned about the cruelty of the deportation of the Jews of Thrace and Macedonia, he worked to ensure that the deportation of the Jews within the pre-war boundaries of Bulgaria would not occur. Peshev wrote a letter to Filov on 19 March which aimed to prevent any future anti-Jewish legislation in Bulgaria. He, along with the Kyustendil delegates, got 43 government deputies to sign the letter. These signatures were only from members of the pro-government majority so that no one could accuse Peshev of acting against the government.

Even under the pressure from the Prime Minister, who was furious at Peshev's letter, 30 deputies refused to withdraw their signatures. As a result, Peshev was censured and dismissed from his position of Assembly Vice-chairman on 24 March.

== Post-War accusations ==
After the war, the Communists brought forth charges on the Old Bulgarian Parliament for collaboration with the Germans. Peshev was tried for being both an anti-Semite and anti-Communist and was even accused of having been bribed by the Jews in exchange for halting the deportation.

== Righteous Among the Nations ==
Peshev's deeds went unrecognized for years after the war as he lived an empty, destitute, and isolated life. In January 1973, Yad Vashem, Israel's Holocaust Museum, awarded him the title of "Righteous Among the Nations," for his role in saving Bulgaria's Jews at considerable risk to himself. He is one of twenty Bulgarians so officially honored. He died that same year and has only been since recognized by Bulgaria as having performed a great service to humanity during the war years.

When asked about his rationale for preventing the Jewish deportation, Peshev once stated: "My human conscience and my understanding of the fateful consequences both for the people involved and the policy of our country now and in the future did not allow me to remain idle. And I decided to do all in my power to prevent what was being planned from happening; I knew that this action was going to shame Bulgaria in the eyes of the world and brand her with a stain she didn't deserve."

== Recognition ==
Inauguration at the Palace of Europe

On 25 January 2000, following the initiative of the Chairman of the Bulgarian delegation to PACE Latchezar Toshev, the Bulgarian Parliament presented the Council of Europe with a bronze bust of Dimitar Peshev. The donation of the bust was accepted by the Committee of Ministers of the Council of Europe and was inaugurated by Lord Russell Johnston in the presence of the Chairman of the Bulgarian National Assembly Yordan Sokolov, the Deputy Secretary General of the Council of Europe Hans Christian Krüger and Ronny Milo, member of the Israeli Knesset. The bust is exhibited in the Palace of Europe in Strasbourg. The creator of the bust is the prominent Bulgarian sculptor Ivan Minekov.

On 25 October 2002, the Dimitar Peshev House-Museum was inaugurated in Kyustendil, Peshev's hometown, to commemorate his life and actions to prevent the deportation of Bulgarian Jews during the Holocaust.

== Honours ==
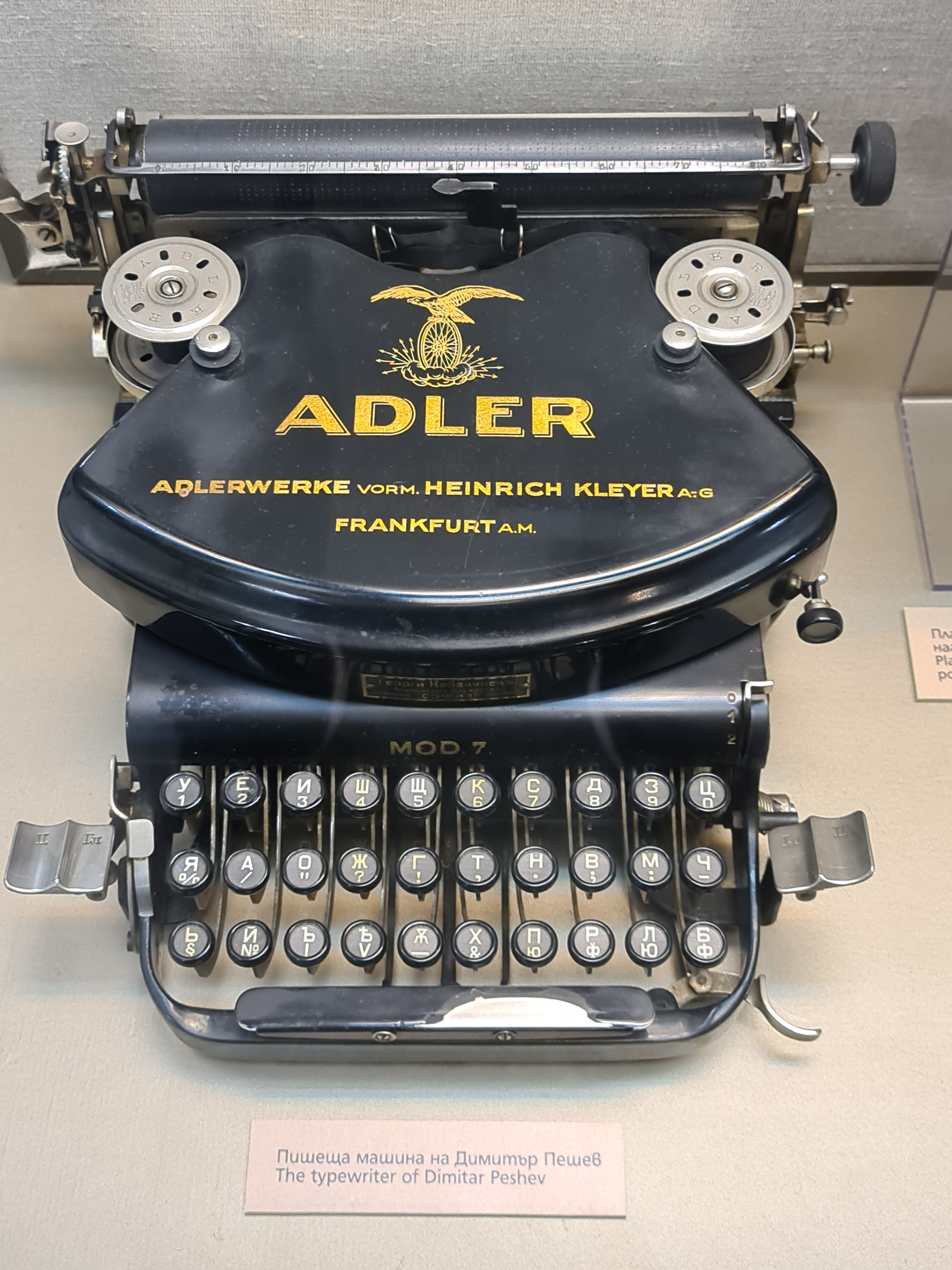
Typewriter "Adler", owned by Dimitar Peshev.

Peshev Ridge on Livingston Island in the South Shetland Islands of Antarctica is named for Dimitar Peshev.

In 2013, Washington, D.C. then Advisory Neighborhood Commissioner Neil Glick proposed giving the name Dimitar Peshev Plaza to the intersection adjacent to the Embassy of Bulgaria in Washington, D.C., at 22nd Street and R Street NW. The Council of the District of Columbia voted unanimously in favor of the proposal. On 12 November 2013, there was a 45-minute ceremony with 75 people. Bulgarian Ambassador Elena Poptodorova, D.C. Council Chairman Phil Mendelson, and Neil Glick spoke at the naming ceremony. It was Peshev's first honor in the Americas. EuroChicago, the largest Bulgarian-American expatriate organization, voted to name the creation of Dimitar Peshev Plaza as the 2013 Bulgarian Event of the Year in the U.S.
