= Boyana Glacier =

Glacier in Antarctica

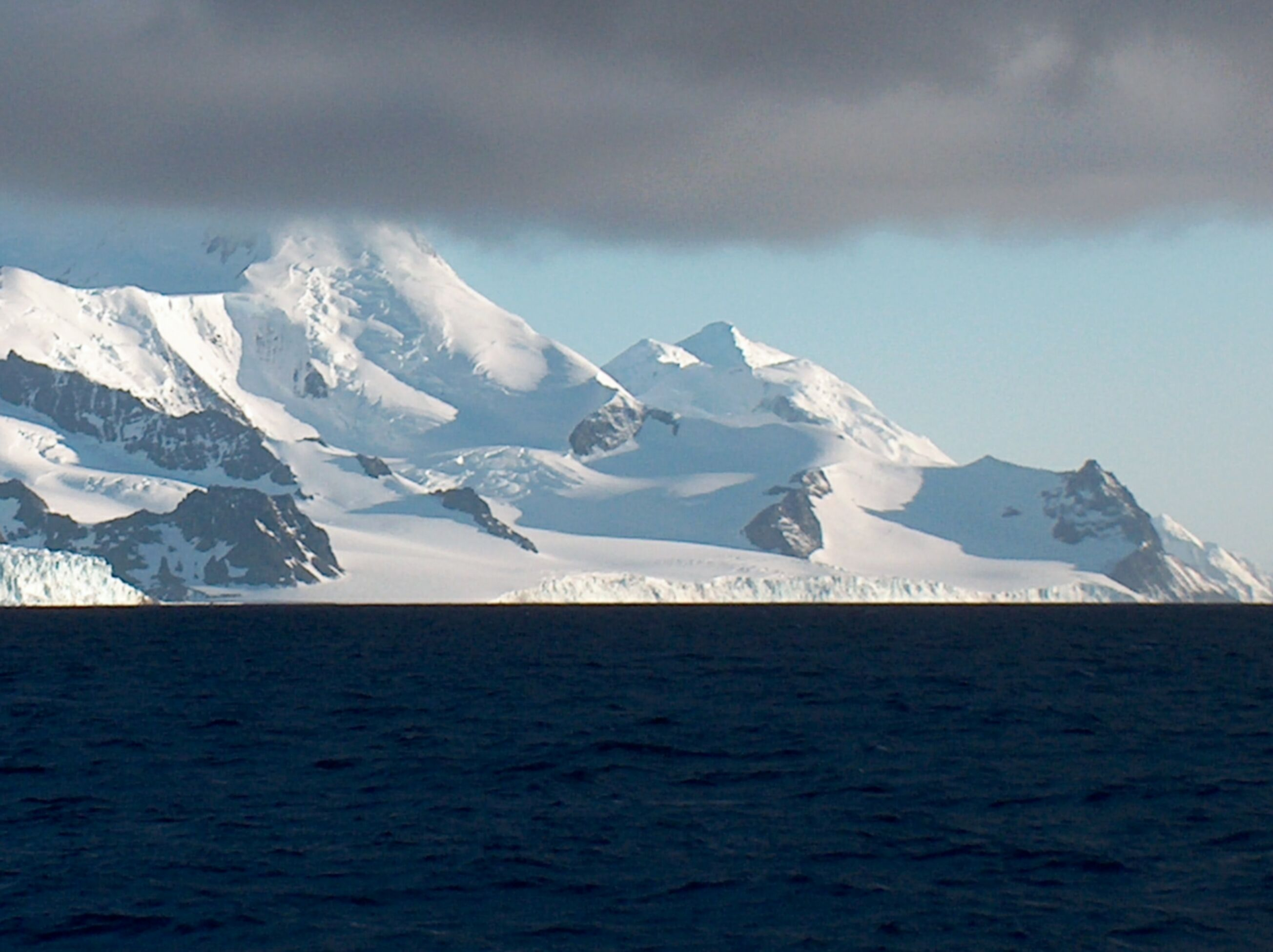
- Boyana Glacier

- Location within South Shetland Islands Location within Antarctica
- Location: Livingston Island
- Coordinates: 62°42′18″S 60°05′30″W
- Length: 3 km (1.9 mi)
- Width: 1.6 km (1.0 mi)
- Thickness: unknown
- Terminus: Bransfield Strait
- Status: unknown

Location of Tangra Mountains on Livingston Island in the South Shetland Islands.

Topographic map of Livingston Island and Smith Islands.

Boyana Glacier (Bulgarian: ледник Бояна, romanized: lednik Boyana, IPA: [ˈlɛdniɡ boˈjanɐ]) in Levski Ridge, Tangra Mountains on Livingston Island, South Shetland Islands in Antarctica is situated southeast of Macy Glacier and west-southwest of Srebarna Glacier. It is bounded by Vazov Rock on the west, St. Naum Peak, Starosel Gate, Silistra Knoll and Kotel Gap on the north, and Christoff Cliff on the east. The glacier extends 3 km in east-west direction and 1.6 km in north-south direction, and flows southeastward into the Bransfield Strait between Vazov Point and Aytos Point.

The feature is named after the Bulgarian settlement of Boyana, now part of Sofia.

== Location ==
The glacier is centred at 62°42′18″S 60°05′30″W. Bulgarian mapping in 2005 and 2009.

== See also ==
- List of glaciers in the Antarctic
- Glaciology

== Maps ==
- South Shetland Islands. Scale 1:200000 topographic map. DOS 610 Sheet W 62 60. Tolworth, UK, 1968.
- Islas Livingston y Decepción. Mapa topográfico a escala 1:100000. Madrid: Servicio Geográfico del Ejército, 1991.
- S. Soccol, D. Gildea and J. Bath. Livingston Island, Antarctica. Scale 1:100000 satellite map. The Omega Foundation, USA, 2004.
- L.L. Ivanov et al., Antarctica: Livingston Island and Greenwich Island, South Shetland Islands (from English Strait to Morton Strait, with illustrations and ice-cover distribution), 1:100000 scale topographic map, Antarctic Place-names Commission of Bulgaria, Sofia, 2005
- L.L. Ivanov. Antarctica: Livingston Island and Greenwich, Robert, Snow and Smith Islands. Scale 1:120000 topographic map. Troyan: Manfred Wörner Foundation, 2010. ISBN 978-954-92032-9-5 (First edition 2009. ISBN 978-954-92032-6-4)
- Antarctic Digital Database (ADD). Scale 1:250000 topographic map of Antarctica. Scientific Committee on Antarctic Research (SCAR), 1993–2016.
