= Starosel Gate =

Coordinates: 62°41′34.5″S 60°06′11″W

Location of Tangra Mountains on Livingston Island in the South Shetland Islands.

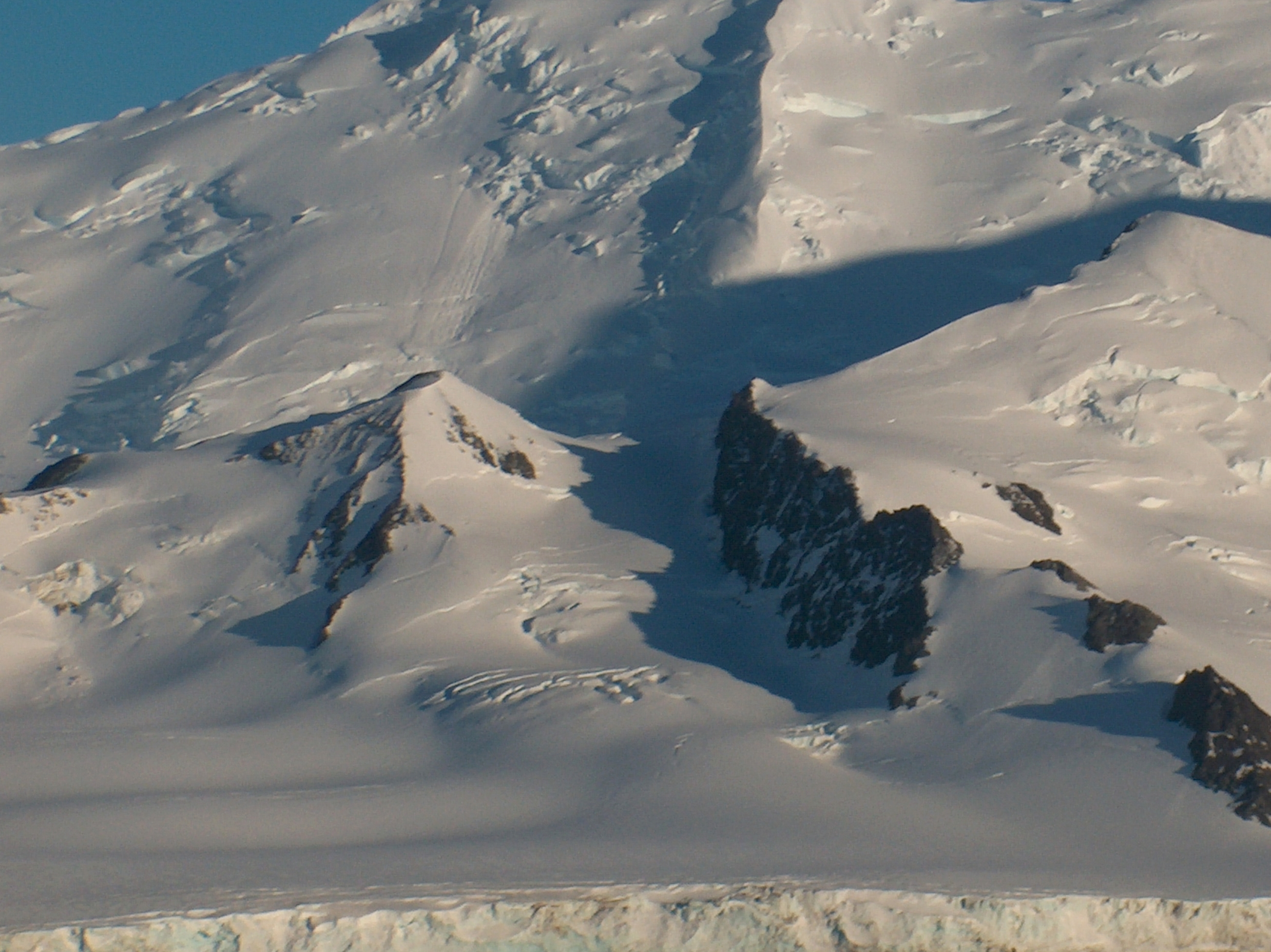
Starosel Gate from Bransfield Strait, with St. Naum Peak to the left, Balchik Ridge to the right, and Boyana Glacier in the foreground.

Topographic map of Livingston Island, Greenwich, Robert, Snow and Smith Islands.

Starosel Gate (Staroselska Porta \sta-ro-'sel-ska 'por-ta\) is a 150-m wide pass of elevation 500 m situated between St. Naum Peak and the north extremity of Balchik Ridge in Levski Ridge, Tangra Mountains on Livingston Island, Antarctica. Providing overland access from Boyana Glacier to upper Macy Glacier. Bulgarian topographic survey Tangra 2004/05. Named after the settlement of Starosel in central Bulgaria.

== Maps ==
- L.L. Ivanov et al. Antarctica: Livingston Island and Greenwich Island, South Shetland Islands. Scale 1:100000 topographic map. Sofia: Antarctic Place-names Commission of Bulgaria, 2005.
- L.L. Ivanov. Antarctica: Livingston Island and Greenwich, Robert, Snow and Smith Islands. Scale 1:120000 topographic map. Troyan: Manfred Wörner Foundation, 2009. ISBN 978-954-92032-6-4
