= Gergana =

Gergana may refer to:

- Gergana (Bulgarian singer), Bulgarian pop-folk singer
- Gergena Branzova, Bulgarian former basketball player
- Gergana Slavcheva (born 1979), Bulgarian basketball player
- Gergana Velinova, co-founder of the Bulgarian Children's Chorus and School Gergana
- Gerri Peev, British-Bulgarian journalist
- 4102 Gergana, a main-belt asteroid
- Gergana, an opera by Georgi Atanasov
- Gergana (poem), a poem by Petko Slaveykov
