= Christoff Cliff =

Location of Livingston Island in the South Shetland Islands.

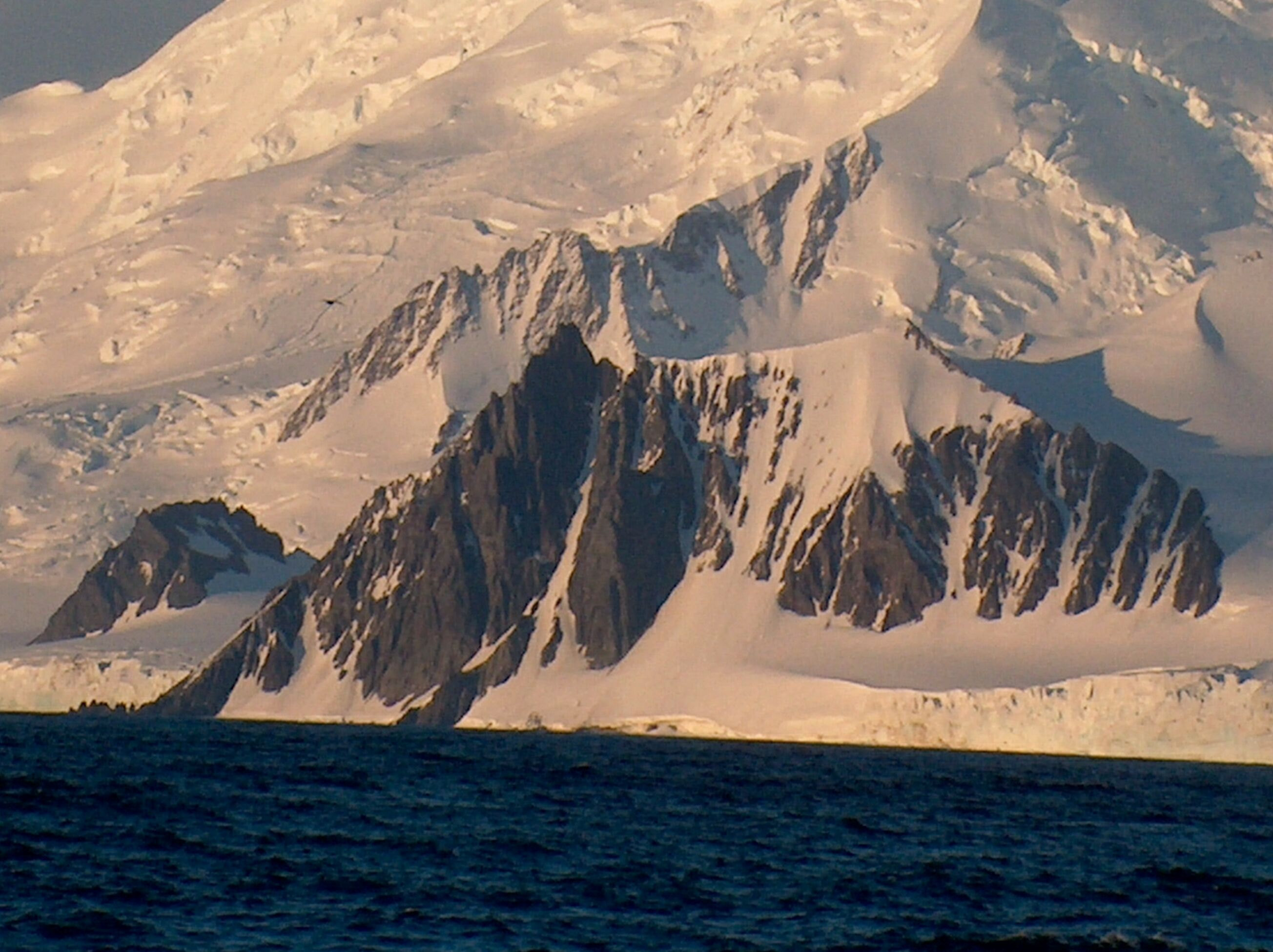
Christoff Cliff from Bransfield Strait.

Topographic map of Livingston Island, Greenwich, Robert, Snow and Smith Islands.

Christoff Cliff (Hristov Kamak \'hris-tov 'ka-m&k\) is a rocky cliff forming Aytos Point on the coast of Bransfield Strait, eastern Livingston Island in the South Shetland Islands, Antarctica. The cliff rises to over 300 m at the southern extremity of an offshoot of Serdica Peak and has ice-free eastern and southern slopes. The cliff overlooks Boyana Glacier to the west and Srebarna Glacier to the northeast. The cliff is named after the famous Bulgarian singer Boris Christoff (1914-93).

== Location ==
The cliff is located at 62°42′00″S 60°03′30″W which is 2 km southeast of Serdica Peak, 2.7 km southwest by south of Radichkov Peak and 2.4 km southeast by east of Silistra Knoll.

== Maps ==
- L.L. Ivanov et al. Antarctica: Livingston Island and Greenwich Island, South Shetland Islands. Scale 1:100000 topographic map. Sofia: Antarctic Place-names Commission of Bulgaria, 2005.
- L.L. Ivanov. Antarctica: Livingston Island and Greenwich, Robert, Snow and Smith Islands. Scale 1:120000 topographic map. Troyan: Manfred Wörner Foundation, 2009. ISBN 978-954-92032-6-4
