= Peshev Ridge =

Feature in the South Shetland Islands, Antarctica

Location of Tangra Mountains on Livingston Island in the South Shetland Islands.

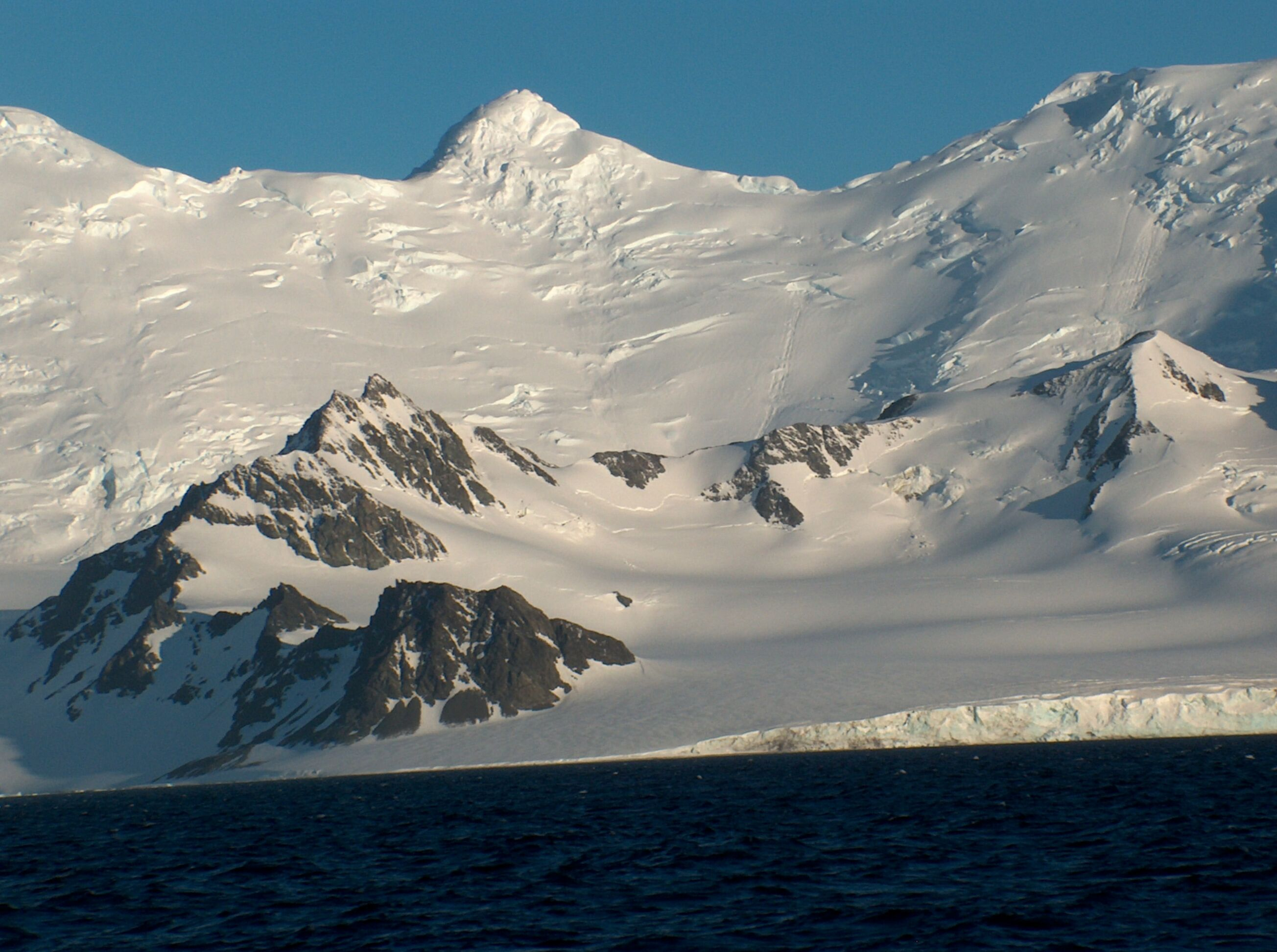
Peshev Ridge from Bransfield Strait, with Lyaskovets Peak in the background.

Topographic map of Livingston Island, Greenwich, Robert, Snow and Smith Islands.

Peshev Ridge (Peshev Rid \'pe-shev 'rid\) is a crescent-shaped ridge in central Tangra Mountains extending 2 km (1.2 mi) along the northeast coast of Brunow Bay and southeast of Macy Glacier, Livingston Island in the South Shetland Islands, Antarctica. Its east extremity is formed by the summit St. Naum Peak (620 m or 2,034 ft), separated from Balchik Ridge to the east by Starosel Gate. The ridge was named in honour of Dimitar Peshev (1894–1973), who led the nationwide campaign that kept Bulgaria’s Jews safe during the Holocaust.

== Location ==
The central peak, named Peshev Peak in association, is located at 62°41′57.8″S 60°07′31″W, which is 4.91 km (3.1 mi) southwest of Great Needle Peak (Falsa Aguja), 4.1 km (2.5 mi) south of Lyaskovets Peak, 4.28 km (2.66 mi) east by south of Simeon Peak and 3.68 km (2.29 mi) northeast of Needle Peak (Bulgarian topographic survey Tangra 2004/05, and mapping in 2005 and 2009).

== Maps ==
- South Shetland Islands. Scale 1:200000 topographic map. DOS 610 Sheet W 62 60. Tolworth, UK, 1968.
- Islas Livingston y Decepción. Mapa topográfico a escala 1:100000. Madrid: Servicio Geográfico del Ejército, 1991.
- S. Soccol, D. Gildea and J. Bath. Livingston Island, Antarctica. Scale 1:100000 satellite map. The Omega Foundation, USA, 2004.
- L.L. Ivanov et al., Antarctica: Livingston Island and Greenwich Island, South Shetland Islands (from English Strait to Morton Strait, with illustrations and ice-cover distribution), 1:100000 scale topographic map, Antarctic Place-names Commission of Bulgaria, Sofia, 2005
- L.L. Ivanov. Antarctica: Livingston Island and Greenwich, Robert, Snow and Smith Islands. Scale 1:120000 topographic map. Troyan: Manfred Wörner Foundation, 2010. ISBN 978-954-92032-9-5 (First edition 2009. ISBN 978-954-92032-6-4)
- Antarctic Digital Database (ADD). Scale 1:250000 topographic map of Antarctica. Scientific Committee on Antarctic Research (SCAR), 1993–2016.
