= Kotel Gap =

Location of Tangra Mountains on Livingston Island in the South Shetland Islands.

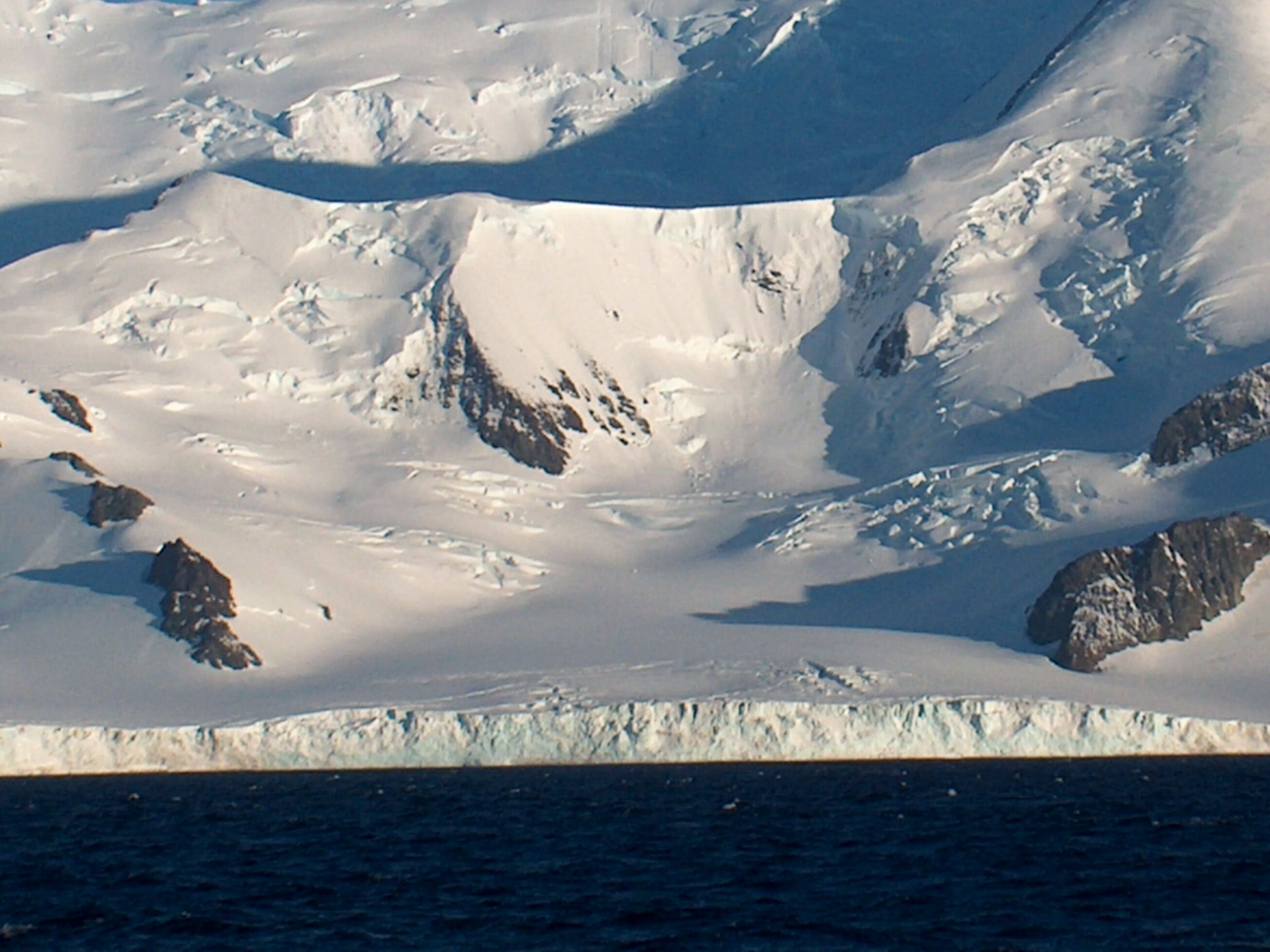
Kotel Gap from Bransfield Strait.

Topographic map of Livingston Island, Greenwich, Robert, Snow and Smith Islands.

Kotel Gap (Kotelska Sedlovina \'ko-tel-ska se-dlo-vi-'na\) is a saddle of elevation 660 m extending 1 km between Serdica Peak and Silistra Knoll in Levski Ridge, Tangra Mountains on Livingston Island in the South Shetland Islands, Antarctica. The saddle is part of the divide between the glacial catchments of Macy Glacier to the north and Boyana Glacier to the south. It was named after the Bulgarian town of Kotel.

== Location ==
The midpoint is located at 62°41′23″S 60°04′53″W.

== Maps ==
- L.L. Ivanov et al. Antarctica: Livingston Island and Greenwich Island, South Shetland Islands. Scale 1:100000 topographic map. Sofia: Antarctic Place-names Commission of Bulgaria, 2005.
- L.L. Ivanov. Antarctica: Livingston Island and Greenwich, Robert, Snow and Smith Islands. Scale 1:120000 topographic map. Troyan: Manfred Wörner Foundation, 2009.
