= Stefka Evstatieva =

Bulgarian operatic soprano (1947–2025)

- Стефка Евстатиева
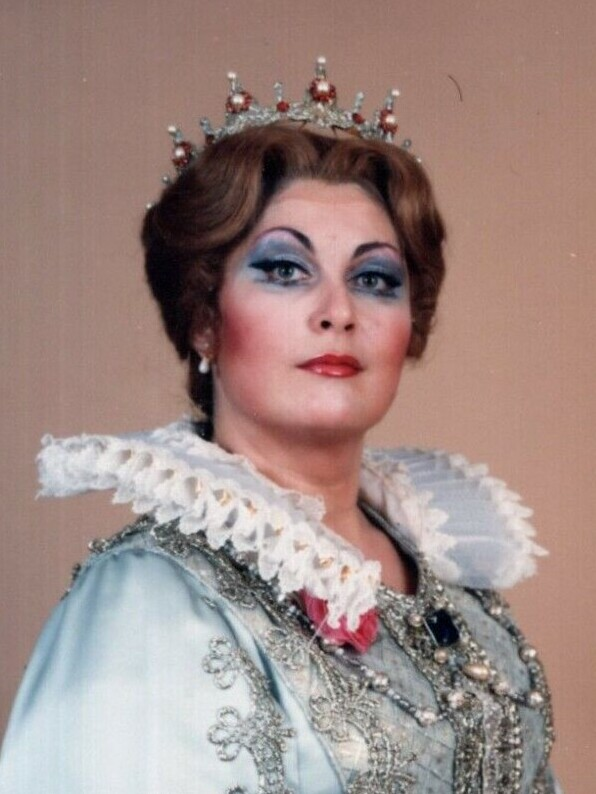
- Evstatieva, c. 1984
- Born: 7 May 1947; Ruse, People's Republic of Bulgaria
- Died: 9 November 2025 (aged 78); Sofia, Bulgaria
- Education: National Academy of Music
- Occupation: Operatic soprano
- Organizations: Sofia National Opera

Stefka Evstatieva (Bulgarian: Стефка Евстатиева, IPA: [ˈstɛfkɐ ɛfstɐtiˈɛvɐ]; 7 May 1947 – 9 November 2025) was a Bulgarian operatic soprano. She performed with the Sofia National Opera from 1979 and soon made an international career at the major opera houses of Europe and the United States. She portrayed Desdemona in Verdi's Otello at the Royal Opera House in London, Maddalena in Giordano's Andrea Chénier at La Scala in Milan, Lisa in Tchaikovsky's The Queen of Spades at the Philadelphia Opera, and Elisabetta in Verdi's Don Carlos at the Metropolitan Opera, among many others.

== Life and career ==
Born in Ruse on 7 May 1947, Evstatieva studied voice at the National Academy of Music in Sofia with Elena Kiselova. She began her career with the Ruse Opera in 1971 where she performed as the first leading role Amelia in Verdi's Un ballo in maschera in 1972 and remained until 1979. In 1974, Evstatieva won the second prize at the International Tchaikovsky Competition in Moscow. In 1978, she won the Grand Prize of Belgian Radio & TV Belcanto Competition; in 1979 Grand Prize and Golden Ring in the Young Singers Competition in Sofia; and in 1982 the Best Performance Award at the Arena di Verona.

Evstatieva joined the Sofia National Opera in 1979; the company toured in West Europe the same year, leading to international engagements. She appeared that year at the Oper Frankfurt, in 1980 at the Vienna State Opera as Leonore in Beethoven's Fidelio, at the Teatro Regio in Turin and in Amsterdam. In 1981, she was successful at the Royal Opera House in London as Desdemona in Verdi's Otello; she also performed at the Munich State Opera. In 1983, she returned to London as Elisabetta in Verdi's Don Carlos and Donna Elvira in Mozart's Don Giovanni; she portrayed Desdemona at the Arena di Verona and Maddalena in Giordano's Andrea Chénier at La Scala in Milan, alongside José Carreras and conducted by Riccardo Chailly.

Evstatieva's first performance in the United States was as Lisa in Tchaikovsky's The Queen of Spades with the Philadelphia Opera, sung in Russian in a performance filmed for television in a project conceived by Gian Carlo Menotti. She appeared alongside Vladimir Popov as Hermann, conducted by Woldemar Nelsson. John O'Connor from the New York Times wrote that while she was not used to the camera, her "lovely voice becomes increasingly impressive as the opera unfolds". Her Metropolitan Opera debut was on 9 April 1984, as Elisabetta alongside Giuliano Ciannella as Don Carlo, conducted by James Levine. She portrayed Verdi's Aida at the San Francisco Opera in 1984, Amelia in Verdi's Un ballo in maschera at the Cologne Opera in 1986, Puccini's Tosca at the Toronto Opera and Leonora in Verdi's La forza del destino at the Miami Opera in 1989. She appeared as Yaroslavna in Borodin's Prince Igor at the Dallas Opera in 1990, as Santuzza in Mascagni's Cavalleria rusticana in 1991, and as Tosca at the Teatro Colón in Buenos Aires.

=== Personal life ===
Evstatieva was married; the couple had a daughter. They settled in the United States, first in Dallas, then from the early 1990s in New Rochelle, New York. There, she helped establish the Bulgarian Children's Chorus and School Gergana, New York, in 2004, and was its advisor from 2009.

Evstatieva died in Sofia after a short illness on 9 November 2025, at the age of 78. On 12 November 2025, Burgas State Opera dedicated its performance of Bellini's Norma (with Marena Balinova in the title role) to her memory.
