= Starosel =

Starosel Старосел
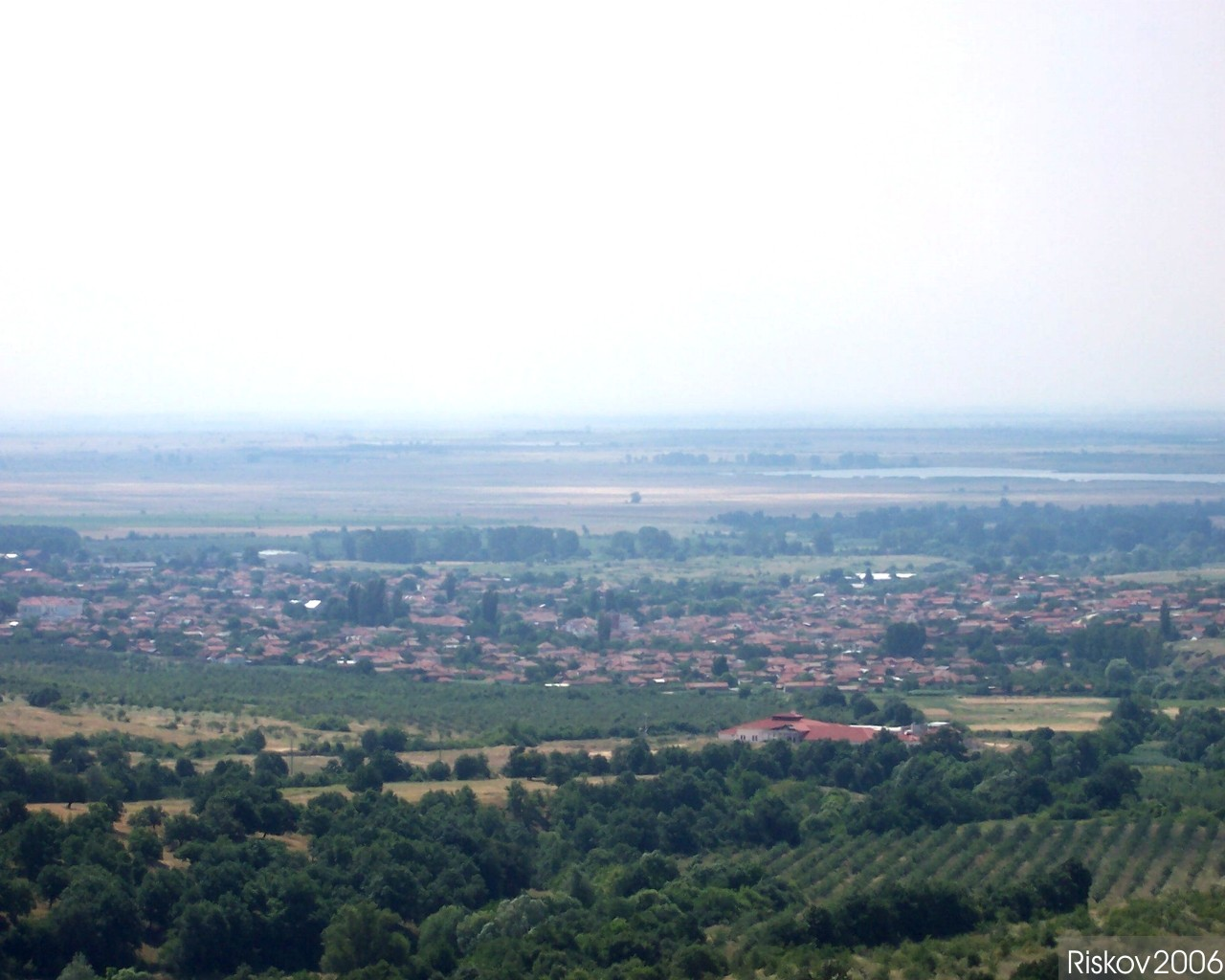

- Location of Starosel, Bulgaria
- Coordinates: 42°29′16.19″N 24°33′54.98″E
- Country: Bulgaria
- Provinces (Oblast): Plovdiv Province

Government
  - Mayor: Mateya Gudev
- Elevation: 358 m (1,175 ft)

Population (15.09.2022)
  - Total: 945
- Time zone: UTC+2 (EET)
  - Summer (DST): UTC+3 (EEST)
- Postal Code: 4175
- Area codes: 03176 from Bulgaria, 003593176 from outside

Starosel (Bulgarian: Старосел) is a village in central Bulgaria, Hisarya Municipality, Plovdiv Province. It lies at the foothills of the Sredna Gora mountain range along the shores of Pyasachnik river.

== History ==
Starosel is known for the abundance of ancient Neolithic and Thracian sites, with some finds dating as far back as the 5th-6th millennium BC. Evidence from 20th-century excavations reveals that the village burgeoned into an important and wealthy Thracian city in the 5th century BC.

Among its main features are the underground temple, the largest of its kind in the Balkan Peninsula, built under the Chetinyova Mogila (tumulus) and a mausoleum. The temple, as well as the nearby Thracian king's residence under Mount Kozi Gramadi, likely date to the reign of Amadocus II (359-351 BC).

Another important site, the Horizont tumulus, contains the only known Thracian temple to feature a colonnade (a Doric one). It is one of ten tumuli located within the location range.

The Kings' palace and treasury have also been discovered nearby at Kozi Gramadi at 1200 m altitude. It was begun under Thracian king Cotys I (384-359 BC). The palace is enclosed with a defensive wall preserved up to a height of 2m and two bastions have been revealed. Philip II of Macedon broke in and captured the palace in 341BC from king Teres II (351-341 BC) and evidence of severe destruction has been found. Among the finds many lead slingshot bullets stamped with the names of Philip's generals Cleobulus and Anaxandros were brought to light within the palace.

In the Middle Ages the surrounding territory was part of the Bulgarian Empire until it was conquered by the Ottomans in the late 14th century as a result of the Bulgarian–Ottoman wars.

In 1798, a cell school and a small church dug into the ground were built. In 1819, the authorities of Constantinople allowed the construction of a new large church, which was destroyed by the Ottomans during the April Uprising in 1876. Nearly 2000 Bulgarians and a few dozen Gypsies, mostly blacksmiths and ironworkers, lived in Staro Novo selo just before the uprising. The village numbered 300 houses and was an important economic center in the region. There were 17 mills and 5 cinders on the river Pyasachnik, as well as 13 mullets and many workshops for carpentry supplies and supplies. There was also a market for cattle. The Bulgarian revolutionary Vasil Levski visited the village in 1869 and 1871, establishing a revolutionary committee. Later, the village took a massive part in the April Uprising of 1876, which was quelled by the Ottomans.

During the uprising, the Ottomans burnt all the houses, the church and the school. All property and food supplies were plundered. Part of the population was killed, while others migrated to northern Bulgaria. On 25 May 1876, 12 participant in the uprising from the village were hanged at the Maritsa River Bridge in Plovdiv. Their names were Miho Mitkov Kabadjov, Pop Atanas Nenkov, Nayden Ivanov Slaninkov, Pop Marco, Todor Stoyanov Nachev, Tancho Georgiev Proichev, Ivan Gumyushev, Ilin Sarafov, Kuman Doichev Pergov, Kosta Koshelakov-Nyagin, Nikola Tarashev and Pencho Koparanski. Another 88 men from the village were sentenced to death but due to international pressure their sentences were commuted to prison and exile in Asia Minor.

Most of the refugees eventually returned to their old settlement, but from superstition did not rebuild the burnt and devastated village, and instead built a new one 2 to 3 km (1.2 to 1.9 mi) down the river. The new village was called Eski Eny Koy (meaning Old New Village), which remained until the 1930s, when it was renamed to Starosel.

== Notable people ==
Born:

- Andreya Proychev - Bulgarian Volunteer from IV Company, IV Company. He took part in the battles of Shipka and near Stara Zagora. For his exceptional bravery during the Russo-Turkish War he was awarded the St. George's Cross - a high Russian military award and a gilded cup - personally by Emperor Alexander II.
- Stoyanka Gruycheva - competitor in academic rowing
- Rangel Gerovski - Bulgarian wrestler in classical style
- Ivan Bogdanov Deliverski – National competitor in freestyle wrestling, European champion, multiple times champion of Bulgaria.
- Iliyan Kaziyski bronze medalist at the World Volleyball Championship 1986. Father of Matey Kaziyski

Died:

- Georgi Kitov (1943 - 2008), Bulgarian archaeologist

== Honour ==
Starosel Gate on Livingston Island in the South Shetland Islands, Antarctica is named after Starosel.

== Gallery ==
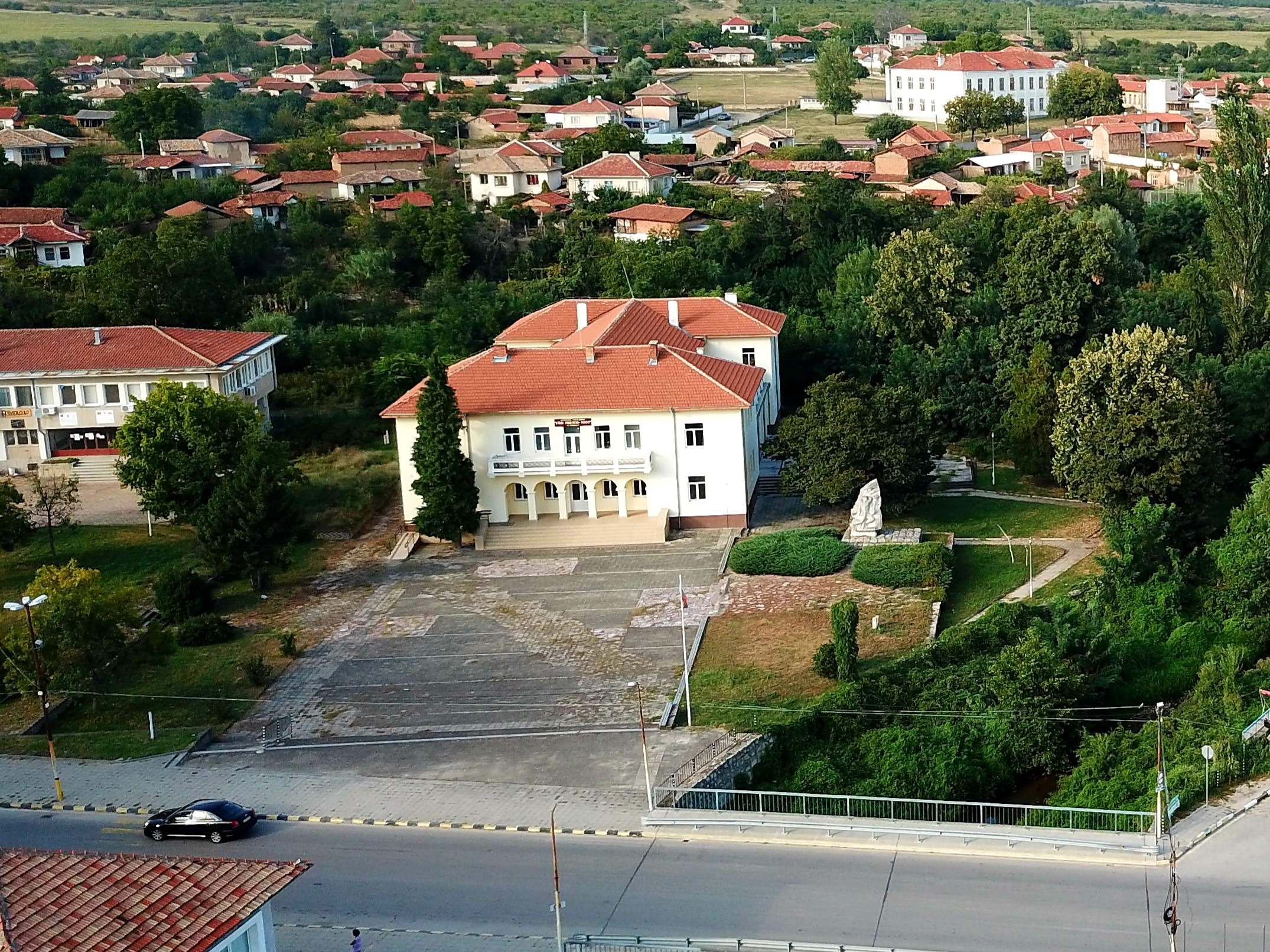
Chitalishte "Geo Milev"

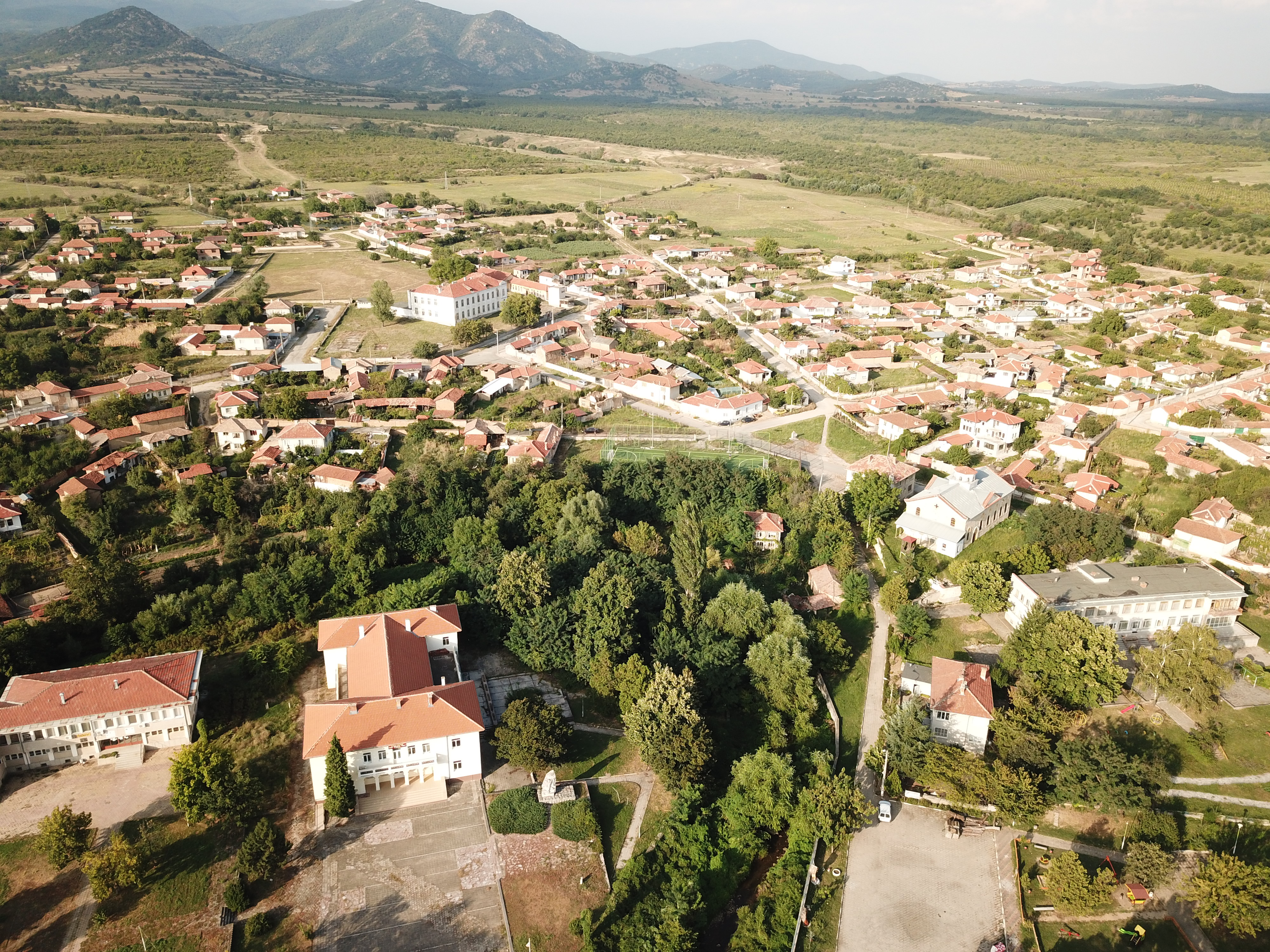
Aerial view of the village

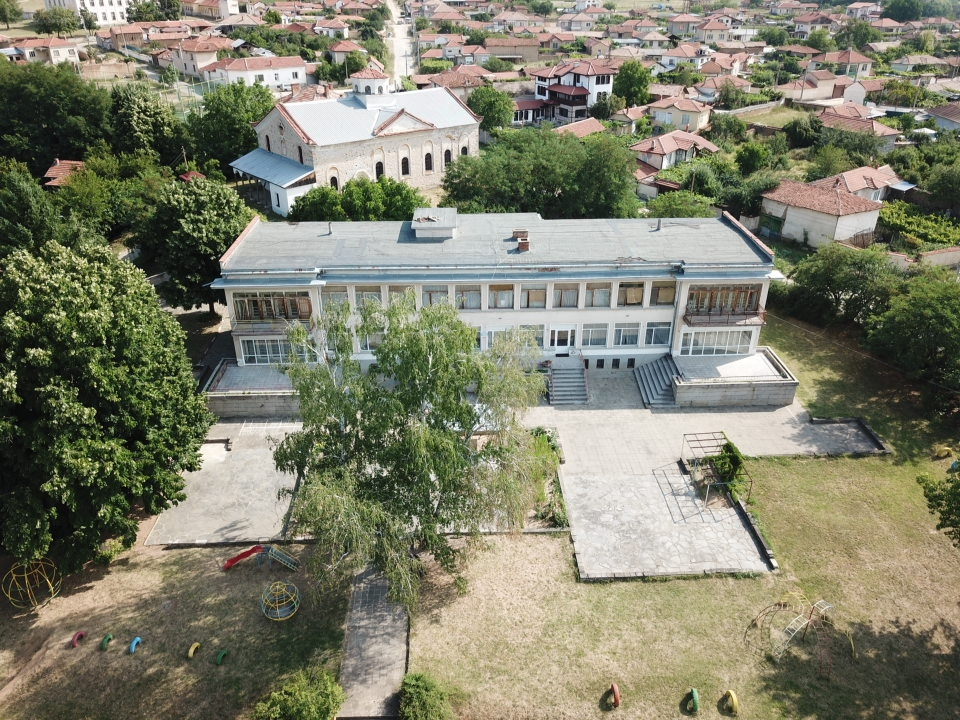
Local kindergarten

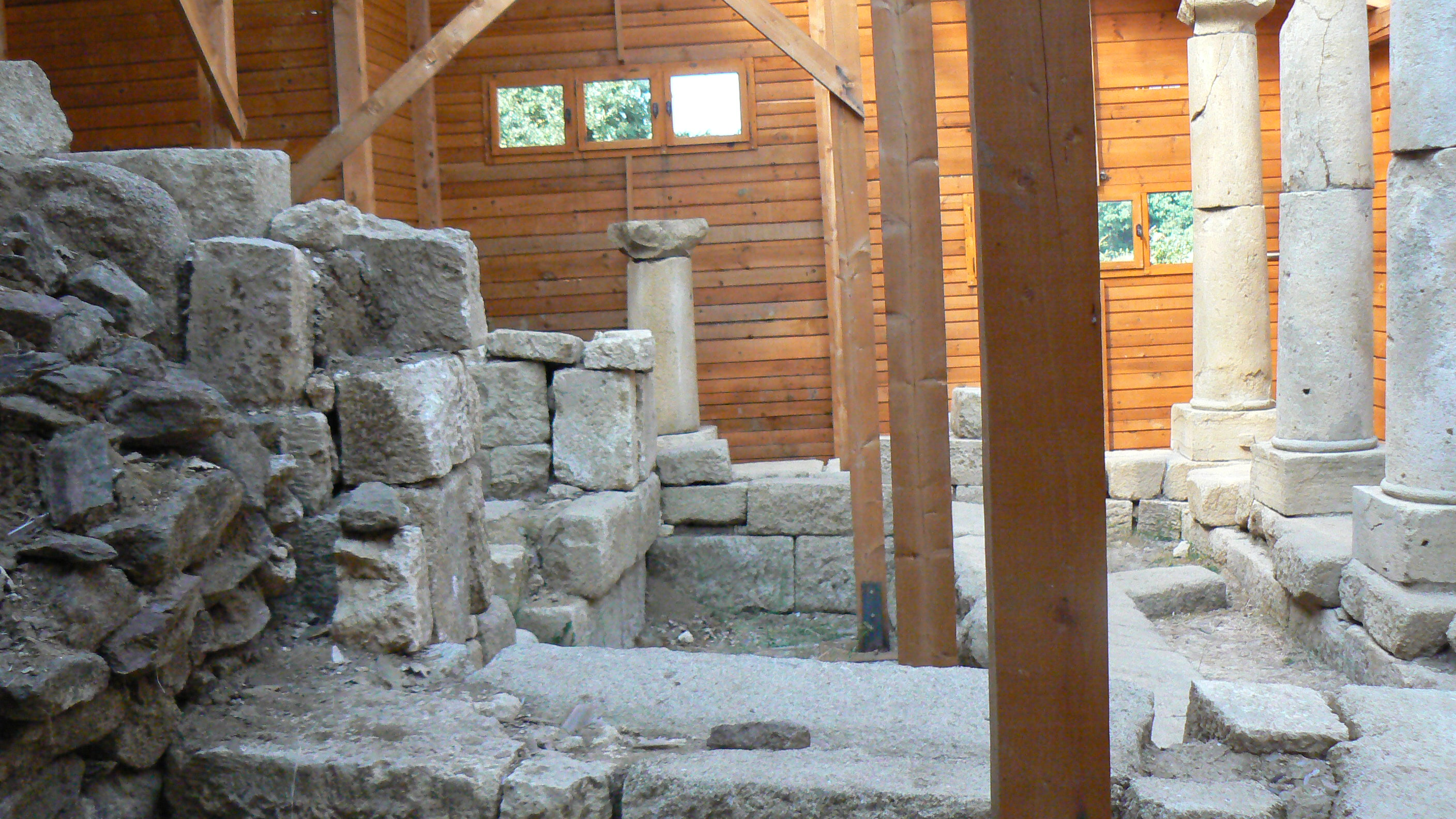
Thracian tomb Horizont

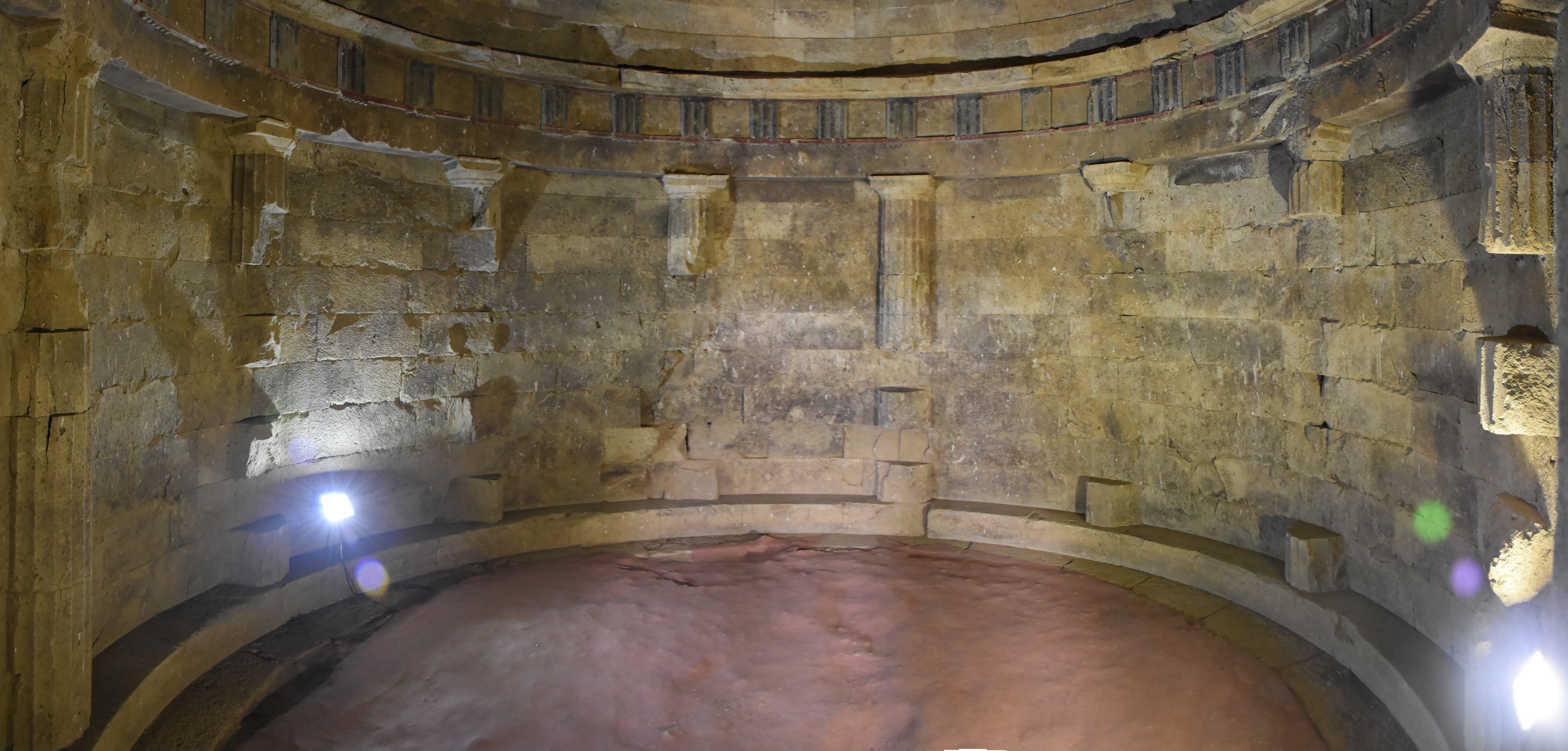
Thracian complex Chetinyova Mogila
