= Bulgarian Children's Chorus and School Gergana =

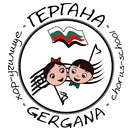

Location
- 220 East 76th Street; New York City, New York 10021; United States

Information
- School type: Bulgarian school and children's chorus
- Principal: Neli Hadjiyska
- Chorus director: Krassi Ivanchev
- Website: gergananyc.com

The Bulgarian Children's Chorus and School Gergana (Bulgarian: Български детски хор и училище "Гергана", pronounced [ɡɛrˈɡanɐ]) is the oldest Bulgarian children's chorus and Bulgarian school in New York City.

== History ==
The chorus was founded in 2004 by jazz singer-songwriter Gergana Velinova helped by opera soprano Stefka Evstatieva, and with the assistance of pianist and piano teacher Pavlina Dokovska and the Consulate General of Bulgaria in New York.

The school was founded in early 2005 by educator Neli Hadjiyska with the initial purpose of helping the chorus children read and understand Bulgarian lyrics.

Since 2009, Gergana participates in Bulgarian Ministry of Education language and culture programs for Bulgarians abroad. Since 2012, the school has been licensed by the Bulgarian government to issue official certificates of completed courses of study of Bulgarian language, history and geography.

Gergana cooperates with the Bulgarian State Agency for Bulgarians Abroad. It is also a member of the non-governmental Association of Bulgarian Schools Abroad, and works with the concert cycle Bulgarian Concert Evenings in New York and other ethnic cultural and educational organizations.

In 2010, Gergana was incorporated as a nonprofit in the State of New York, and in 2012, it passed guidelines according to which its "mission is to provide free education to students from preschool to 18 years of age in the Bulgarian language, music and culture through choral and solo singing, acting, Bulgarian language, literature and history classes, publishing of free study materials, as well as other educational modalities.

== School ==
Gergana teaches Bulgarian community children from the New York metropolitan area. As of October 15, 2013, all students but one were American-born; some are from inter-ethnic families where little or no Bulgarian is spoken at home.

For the 2013–14 school year, the school offers a preschool group for children under 5; two preparatory groups for children with limited or no Bulgarian; a kindergarten class, classes from first to eighth, a drama studio, and a dance studio. Teaching in Bulgarian is conducted according to Bulgarian government standards, using authorized textbooks and study materials.

As of November 10, 2013, a total of 69 children aged 3 to 14 have been enrolled in the school; 37 of them participate in the chorus. The Gergana faculty includes nine teachers.

Classes are held on Sundays from 10 am to 2.30 pm and from mid-September to mid-June. Teaching is conducted in small classes with individual attention to each child.

== Chorus ==
The Gergana children's chorus with director Krassi Ivanchev, vocal coach Stefka Evstatieva and pianist Magdalena Dushkina has performed (as of June 16, 2013) a total of 66 concerts, including some at Carnegie Hall, Symphony Space, and the United Nations headquarters. The chorus participates in Bulgarian celebrations in New York and holds a traditional Christmas concert at the Sts. Cyril and Methodius Bulgarian Cathedral.

Chorus concerts have also included special guests such as Bulgarian composer Haigashod Agassian and Bulgarian painter and experimental artist Houben R.T. There have been joint concerts with other ethnic schools, such as one with the Czech and Slovak School, Astoria, New York, on June 1, 2013, at the Bohemian National Hall in New York.

The chorus repertory includes Bulgarian and American choral classics, composer-arranged Bulgarian traditional folklore, and contemporary world music, including in-house music arrangements and original lyrics.

Gergana choristers have successfully applied to leading New York arts schools such as LaGuardia Arts et al.

In early 2013, "The Gergana Community Men's Chorus" was formed by parents, teachers and friends of the school children. Its purpose is also to serve as a Bulgarian language course for English-speaking parents, other family and friends and engage them with Gergana activities.

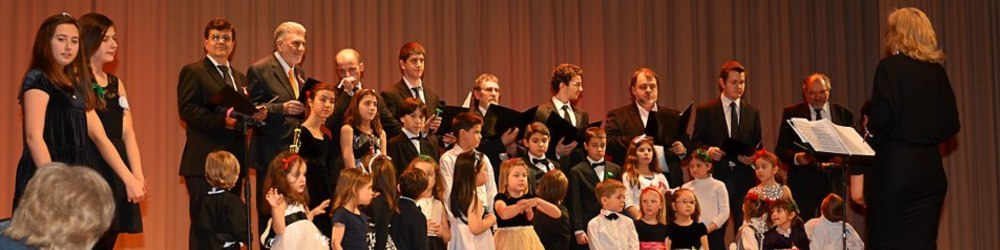

The children's chorus and the men's chorus: three generations on stage together

== Drama studio ==
Launched in 2006 by actress and NATFA professor Madlen Cholakova, since the fall of 2012, it has been directed by actress and singer Gina DiDonato. In 2012, it staged a dramatization of Foxy's Adventures ("Приключенията на Лиско") by Boris Aprilov, and in 2013, it is staging an adaptation of the musical The Sound of Music for children's chorus, translated into Bulgarian. Currently, a documentary film is being made on Gergana's work on the latter, to be shown in late 2013 on Bulgarian National Television and Bulgarian-language BG7 TV in Chicago.

Drama productions are intended to develop children's public speaking skills.

== Dance studio ==
The studio started in September 2013 with Bulgarian folk dances. A rhythmic gymnastics class for girls was launched in October 2013 by former Bulgarian national team member, World Cup winner, and New York-based coach Boryana Yordanova, accompanied by a gym class for boys. The studio is also planning to offer classical ballet and ballroom dances classes.

== Publishing ==
The 'Gergana' Songbook (Bulgarian: "Песнопойка "Гергана") (2013), compiled by Gergana teachers and published by the State Agency for Bulgarians Abroad, contains 39 selected Bulgarian songs from the children's chorus repertory from 2004 to 2011, with sheet music and English translations by Valentin Hadjiyski. The songbook will be distributed free of charge by the Agency to Bulgarian schools abroad.

The English translations are intended to help children understand Bulgarian lyrics and to involve English-speaking parents, family and friends, as well as to popularize Bulgarian songs and poetry for the broader American audience.

== In the media ==
Gergana has been featured in publications by Bulgarian-language newspapers Az Buki (Аз Буки), Bulgaria 21, Bulgaria Sega (България Сега), web sites dir.bg, eurochicago.com, ide.li, Мediapool.bg, official web sites of the Bulgarian Agency for Bulgarians Abroad and the Union of Bulgarian Journalists, in Bulgarian National Television news stories, in the Skat Television's My Little White Cloud (Облаче ле бяло) show, by the Bulgarian National Radio, Internet Radio Tatkovina (Интернет радио "Татковина"), and more.

== Awards ==
School principal Neli Hadjiyska has received the annual Neofit Rilski Honorary Award for 2013 from the Bulgarian Minister of Education for her lifetime professional contribution to Bulgarian education and the Federation of Balkan-American Associations Award for the advancement of women for 2012. Gergana has also received certificates of appreciation from the Turkish Women's League of America in 2012 and 2013 and from the Cyril and Methodius International Foundation and the Petko Gruev Staynov foundation in 2010.

Gergana students have won essay-writing awards from the national Stefan Gechev Children's and Youth Literary Competition held annually by the State Agency for Bulgarians Abroad.

== Accommodation ==
From its inception through the end of 2012, Gergana was housed at the Consulate General of Bulgaria building in Manhattan at 121 East 62nd Street.

In January 2013, it moved to the Robert F. Wagner Middle School (MS 167) building on Manhattan's Upper East Side, where it uses the auditorium and several classrooms on the first floor.

== See also ==
- Education in New York City
- List of pre-college music schools
- Music of New York City
