= Silistra Knoll =

Mountain in Antarctica

Location of Tangra Mountains on Livingston Island in the South Shetland Islands.

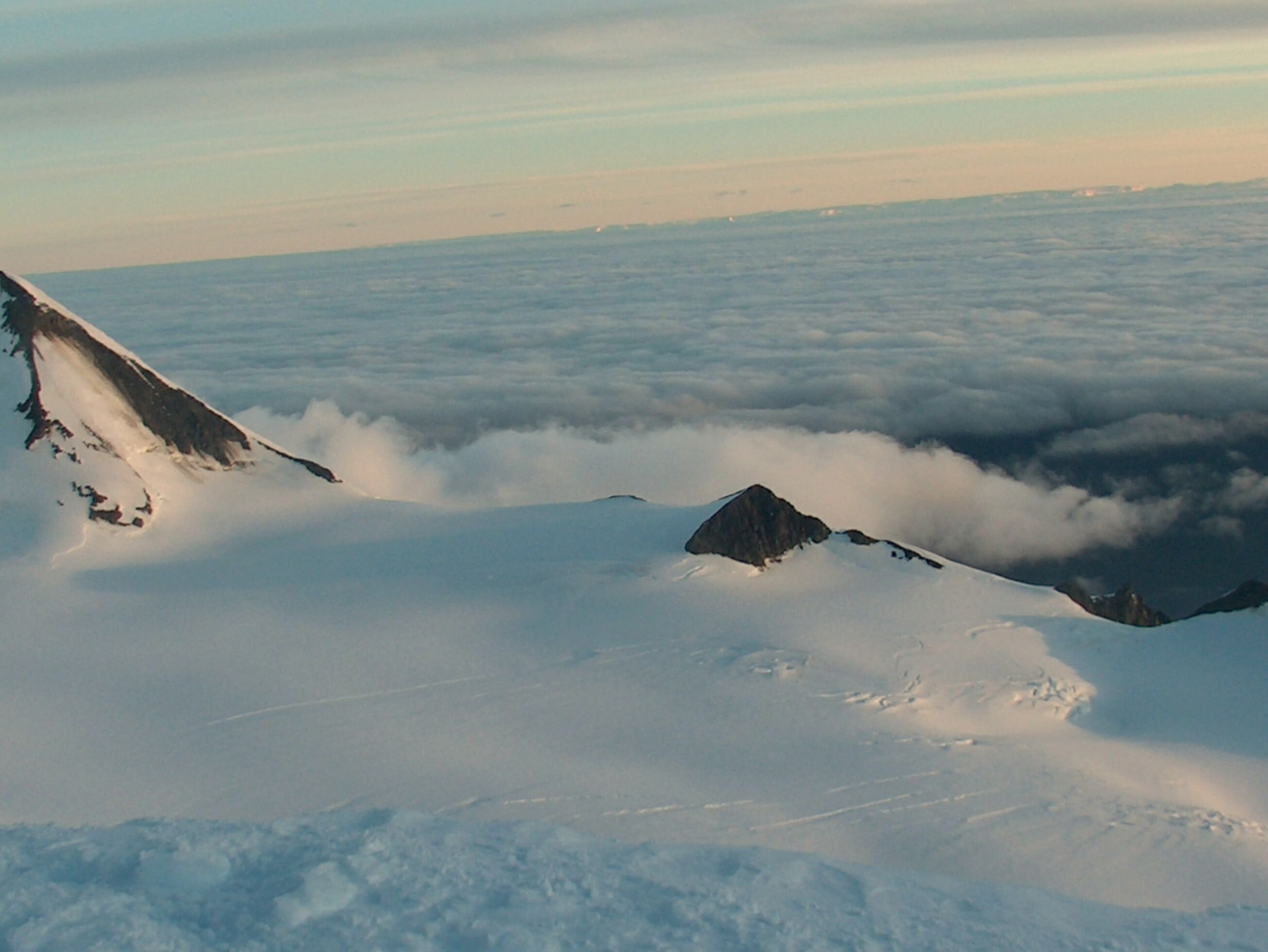
Silistra Knoll from Catalunyan Saddle, with Macy Glacier in the foreground and Bransfield Strait in the background.

Topographic map of Livingston Island, Greenwich, Robert, Snow and Smith Islands.

Silistra Knoll (Bulgarian: връх Силистра, romanized: vrah Silistra, IPA: [ˈvrɤx siˈlistrɐ]) rises to over 700 m (2,297 ft) in southern Levski Ridge, in the Tangra Mountains of Livingston Island in the South Shetland Islands, Antarctica. It is bounded by Macy Glacier to the north and Boyana Glacier to the south.

== Location ==
The knoll is located at 62°41′25.8″S 60°05′30″W, which is 2.09 km (1.30 mi) southwest of Serdica Peak to which the knoll is linked by Kotel Gap, 2.78 km (1.73 mi) northwest of Aytos Point, 1.98 km (1.23 mi) northeast of Peshev Peak and 2.86 km (1.78 mi) south of the summit of St. Ivan Rilski Col (Bulgarian mapping in 2005 and 2009).

== Maps ==
- L.L. Ivanov et al. Antarctica: Livingston Island and Greenwich Island, South Shetland Islands. Scale 1:100000 topographic map. Sofia: Antarctic Place-names Commission of Bulgaria, 2005.
- L.L. Ivanov. Antarctica: Livingston Island and Greenwich, Robert, Snow and Smith Islands. Scale 1:120000 topographic map. Troyan: Manfred Wörner Foundation, 2009. ISBN 978-954-92032-6-4
