= Ivan Minekov =

- Born: Ivan Minekov; 28 January 1947 (age 79); Pazardzhik, Bulgaria
- Website: www.ivanminekov.com

Ivan Minekov (Bulgarian: Иван Минеков) is one of the most appreciated contemporary Bulgarian sculptors. He lives and works in Sofia.

A graduate of the Academy for Fine Arts "Nicolae Grigorescu" in Bucharest, Romania (1970–1975), under Professor Paul Vasilescu's beneficial guidance, Ivan Minekov's striking talent quickly attracted the attention of the Bulgarian artistic society.

In the early years of his career, Ivan Minekov participated in all common exhibitions in Bulgaria, as well as in representative exhibitions in Europe. In the period between 1975 and 1990 he completed a number of large monumental works in many Bulgarian cities, among which his native Pazardzhik, Burgas (1978), Rousse, Lovech, Dorkovo and others.

In the same period he was included in the Encyclopedia of Bulgarian Fine Arts. The Bulgarian National Television produced a short film about his monumental work Levski (1987) and a documentary about the artist (1988), which is now included in BNT's golden fund. Also in 1988, Minekov's work was chosen as a symbol of the second allied space journey of Bulgaria and Russia.

The portrait of Professor Denton Cooley (1990), founder of the Texas Heart Institute, owned and deeply appreciated by Mr. Cooley, as well as Georges Ecly's interest towards Minekov's art, opened the doors to a rewarding international artistic career. In 1993-94 the Harada Collection in Tokyo commissioned Ivan Minekov to create the portrait of Peter Michailov and in the year of 2000, Minekov's inclination towards mythology and history brought to life Dimitar Peshev's portrait, honoring the great politician for saving the Bulgarian Jews in World War II. The bust has proudly found its place in the Palace of Europe in Strasbourg.

Today Minekov's works are owned by private collectors throughout Europe, USA, Israel and Japan. In the last few years the artist has participated in two exhibitions in the Netherlands (2005, 2007) and in a joint exhibition with painter Branimir Tzakov in the Seasons Gallery in Sofia (2006). He has also completed two portraits commissioned by private collectors from New York, USA. In 2007 Ivan Minekov was chosen as one of Bulgaria's leading artists to be represented on the Ministry of Foreign Affairs official website.
