= Eurochicago.com =

EuroChicago (Bulgarian: Еврочикаго) is a Bulgarian news and media portal started in 2003 by Petar Stamatov. It covers Bulgarian news, with a special emphasis on the Bulgarian diaspora.

== About ==
EuroChicago.com is a media outlet updated every day, with the most attention given to the gathering and reporting of news, but the site has many other sections, including photo galleries, forums, polls and contests.

Most of the published stories are original content. The website has been quoted by the largest Bulgarian media outlets, including the Bulgarian News Agency. In addition, articles in English and Russian have been cited by American and European newspapers and websites.

This media outlet has adopted and follows the Ethics Code of the Society of Professional Journalists.

Eurochicago.com won the 2015 annual award for Bulgarian Media Abroad presented by the Union of Bulgarian Journalists.

== See also ==
- Official website
