= Aytos Point =

Location in Antarctica

Location of Livingston Island in the South Shetland Islands

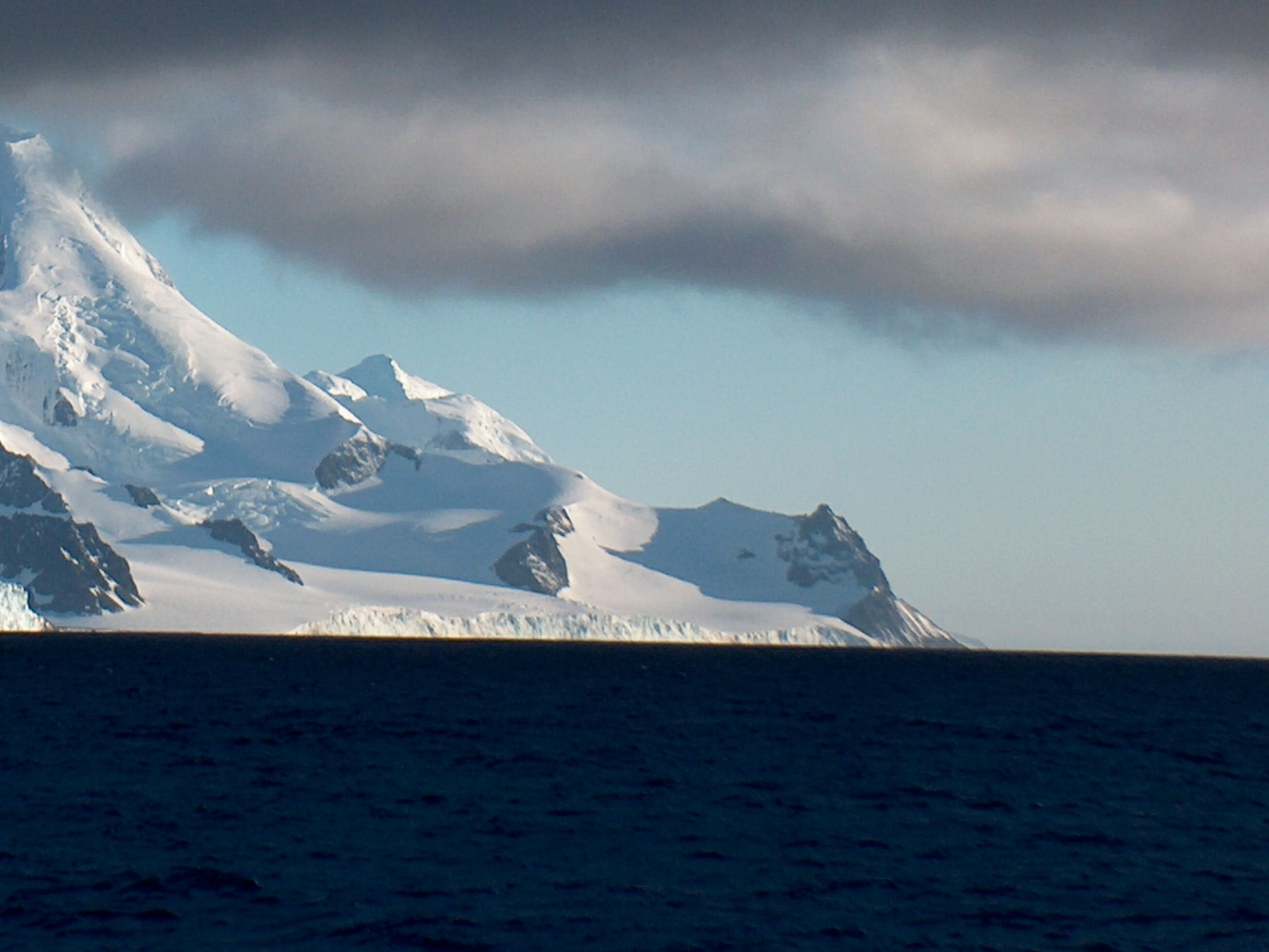
Aytos Point

Topographic map of Livingston Island and Smith Island

Aytos Point (Nos Aytos \'nos 'ay-tos\) is a point on the coast of Bransfield Strait, Livingston Island, Antarctica formed by an offshoot of Christoff Cliff. The point was named after the Bulgarian town of Aytos.

== Location ==
Aytos Point is located at 62°42′23.5″S 60°02′59.5″W which is 5.57 km east by north east of Samuel Point and 2.53 km southwest of M'Kean Point.

The point was mapped by the UK Directorate of Overseas Surveys in 1968, and by Bulgaria in 2005 and 2009.

== See also ==
- Bulgarian toponyms in Antarctica
- Antarctic Place-names Commission

== Maps ==
- South Shetland Islands. Scale 1:200000 topographic map. DOS 610 Sheet W 62 60. Tolworth, UK, 1968.
- Islas Livingston y Decepción. Mapa topográfico a escala 1:100000. Madrid: Servicio Geográfico del Ejército, 1991.
- S. Soccol, D. Gildea and J. Bath. Livingston Island, Antarctica. Scale 1:100000 satellite map. The Omega Foundation, USA, 2004.
- L.L. Ivanov et al., Antarctica: Livingston Island and Greenwich Island, South Shetland Islands (from English Strait to Morton Strait, with illustrations and ice-cover distribution), 1:100000 scale topographic map, Antarctic Place-names Commission of Bulgaria, Sofia, 2005
- L.L. Ivanov. Antarctica: Livingston Island and Greenwich, Robert, Snow and Smith Islands. Scale 1:120000 topographic map. Troyan: Manfred Wörner Foundation, 2010. ISBN 978-954-92032-9-5 (First edition 2009. ISBN 978-954-92032-6-4)
- Antarctic Digital Database (ADD). Scale 1:250000 topographic map of Antarctica. Scientific Committee on Antarctic Research (SCAR), 1993–2016.
