= Antarctic Place-names Commission =

Body affiliated with the Ministry of Foreign Affairs of Bulgaria

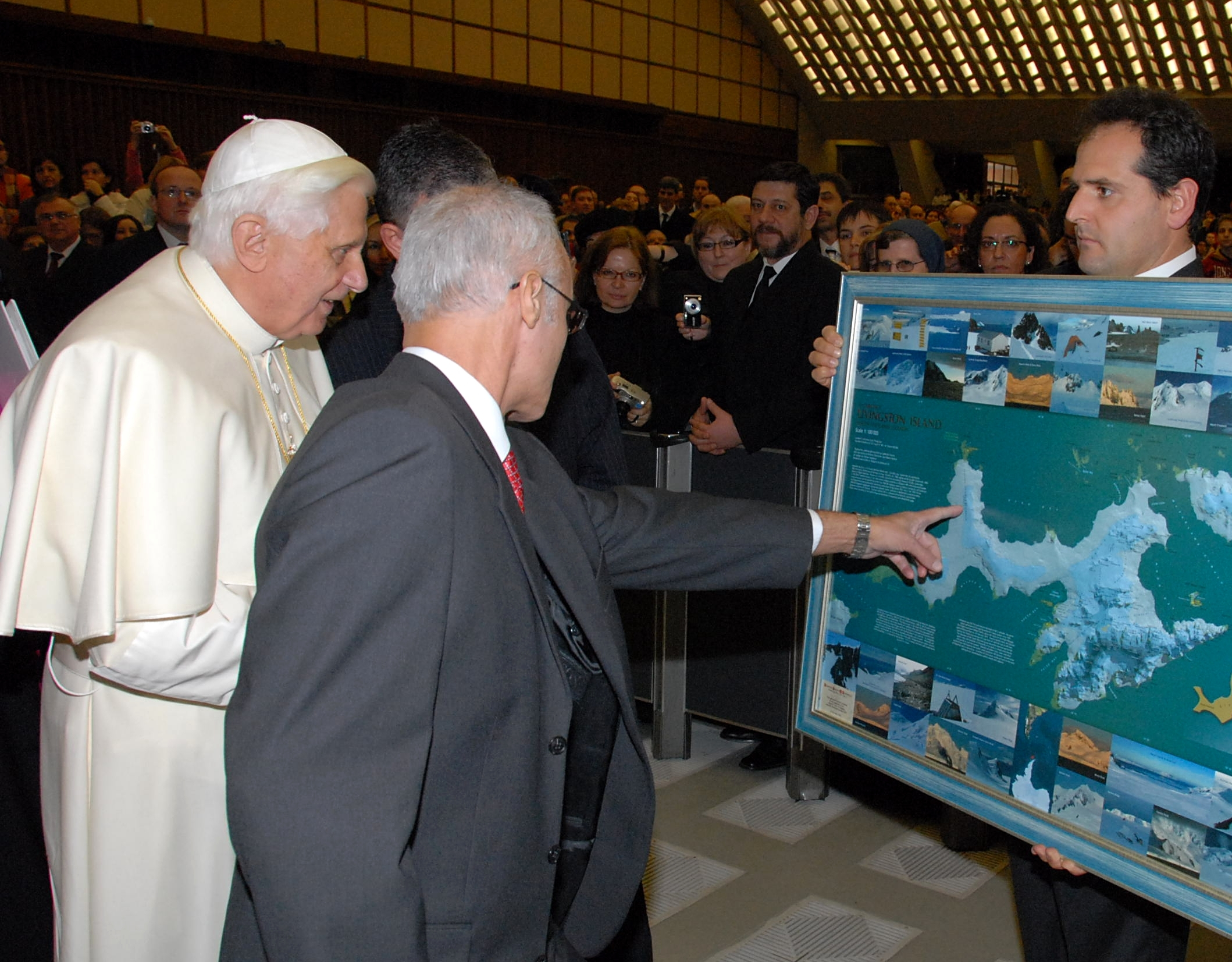
H.H. Benedict XVI presented with the 2005 Bulgarian map of Livingston Island

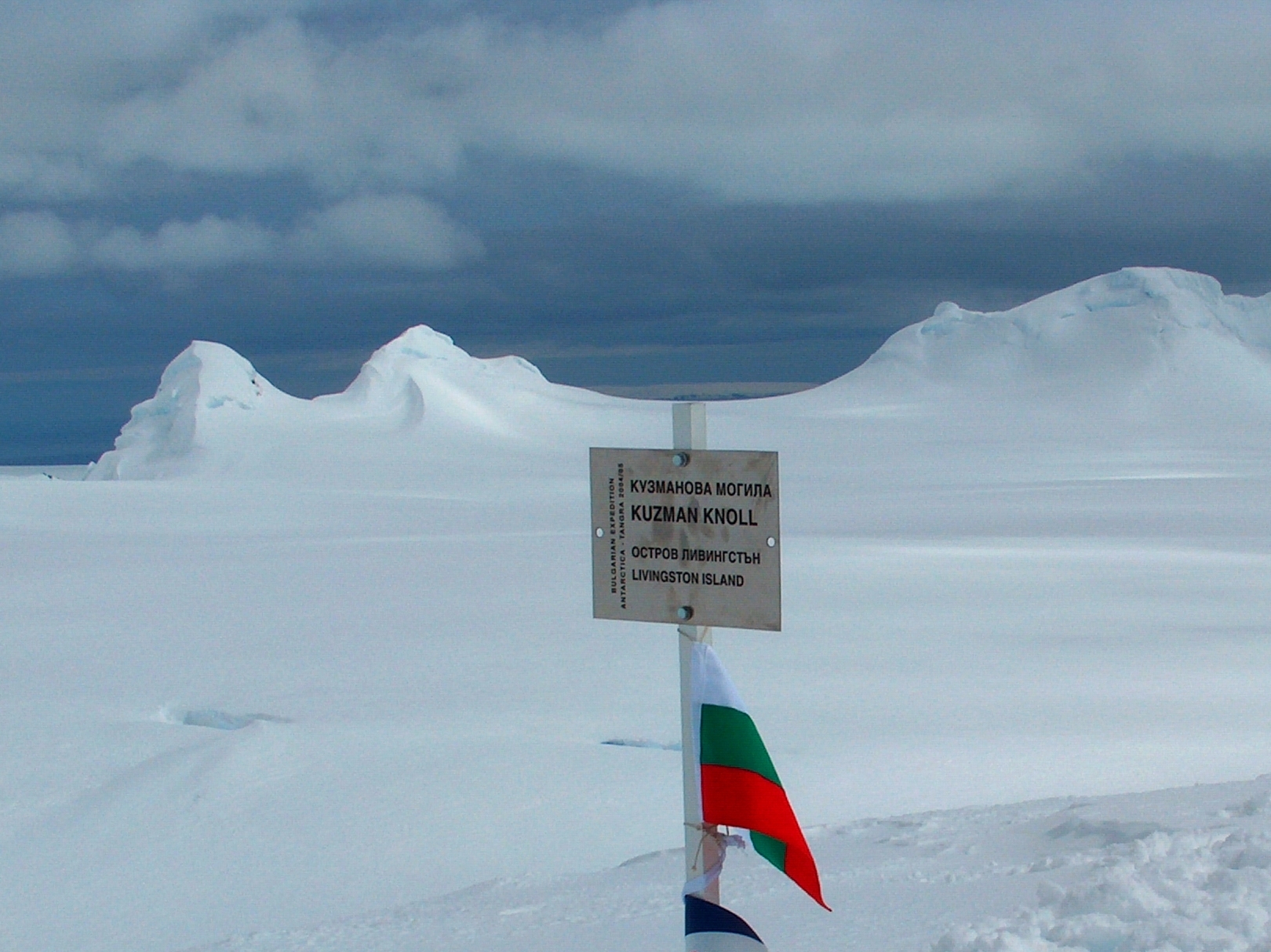
Field work for the Commission

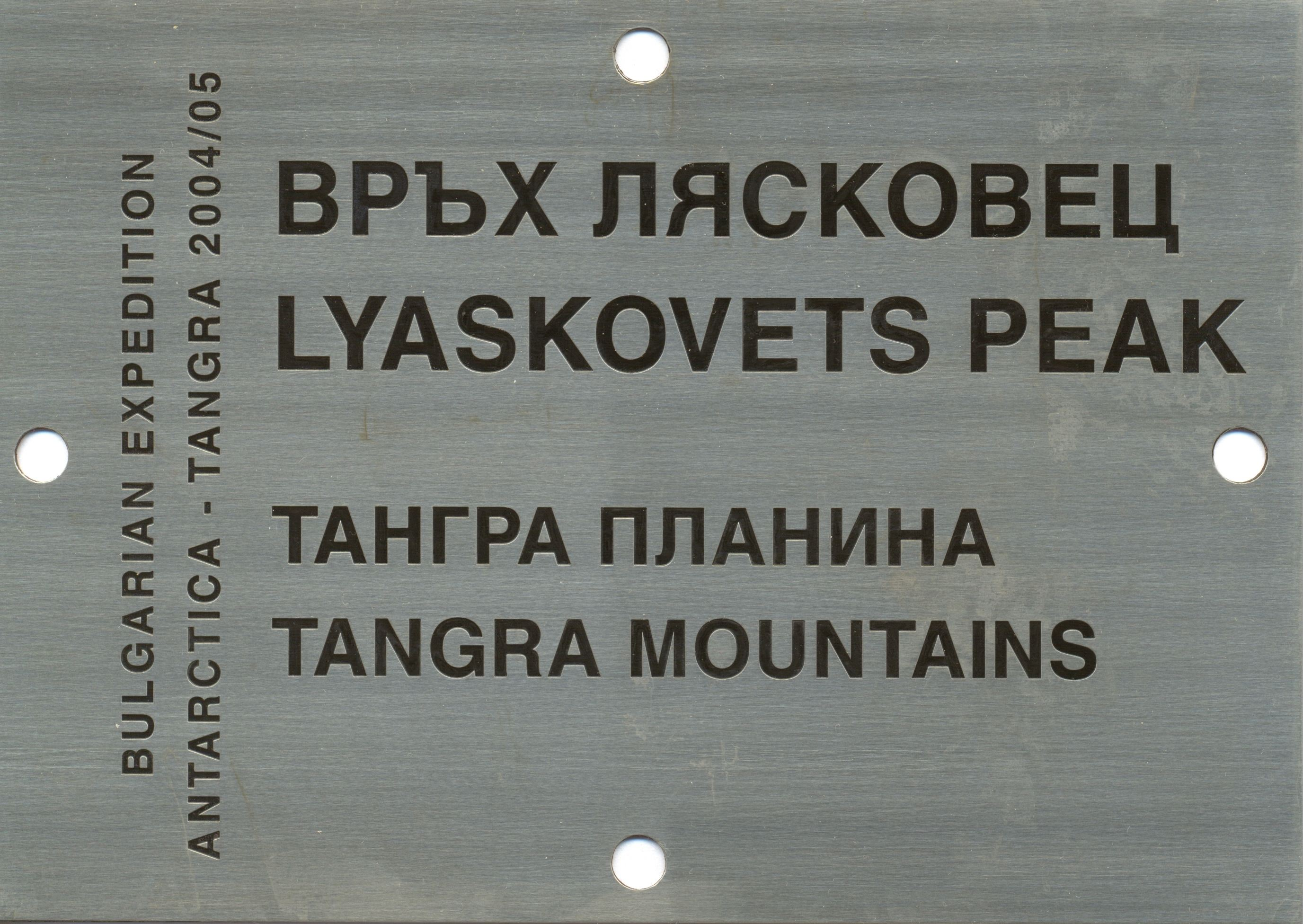
Topographic marker used by the Commission

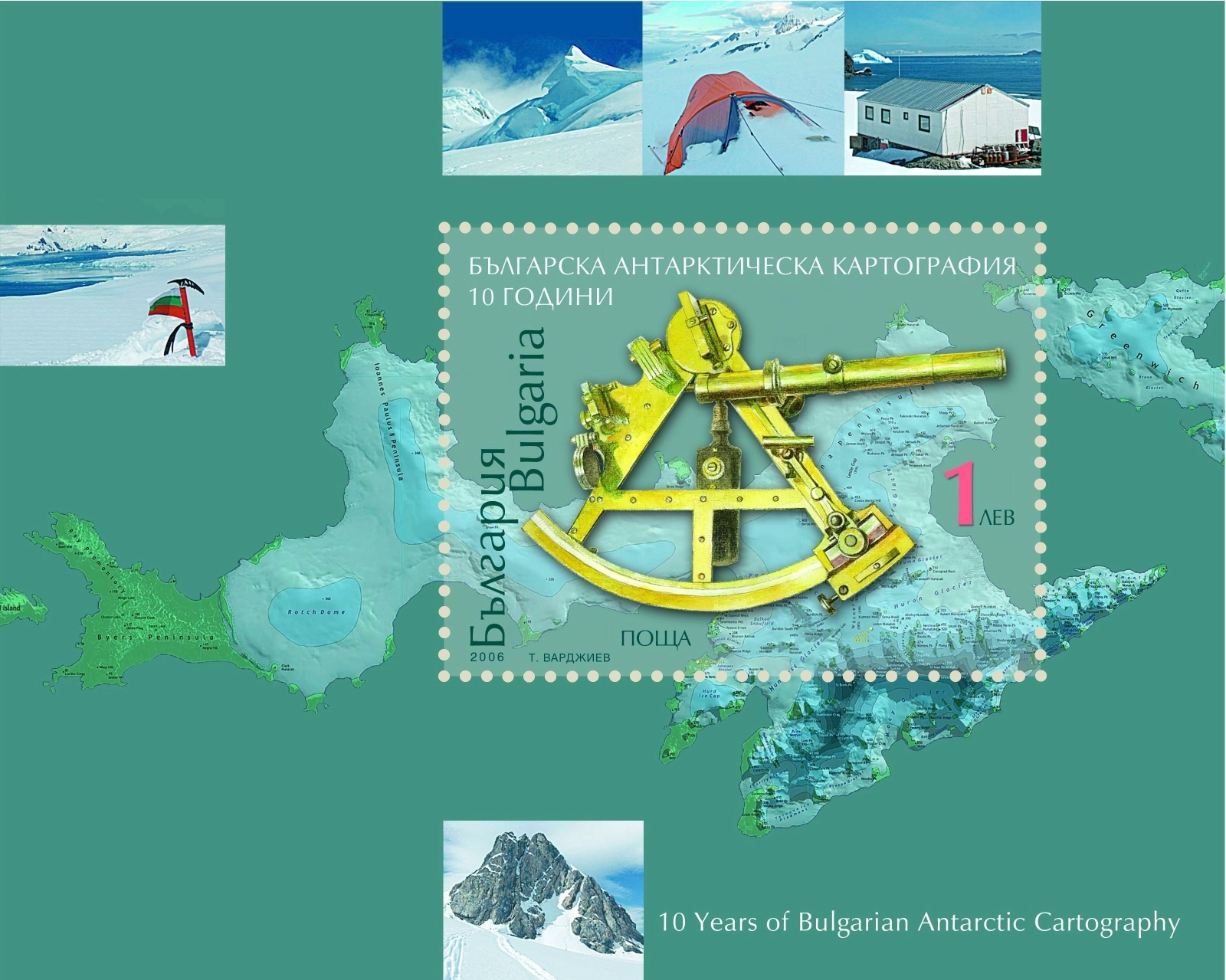
A stamp commemorating the Tenth Anniversary of Bulgarian Antarctic cartography in the service of the Commission

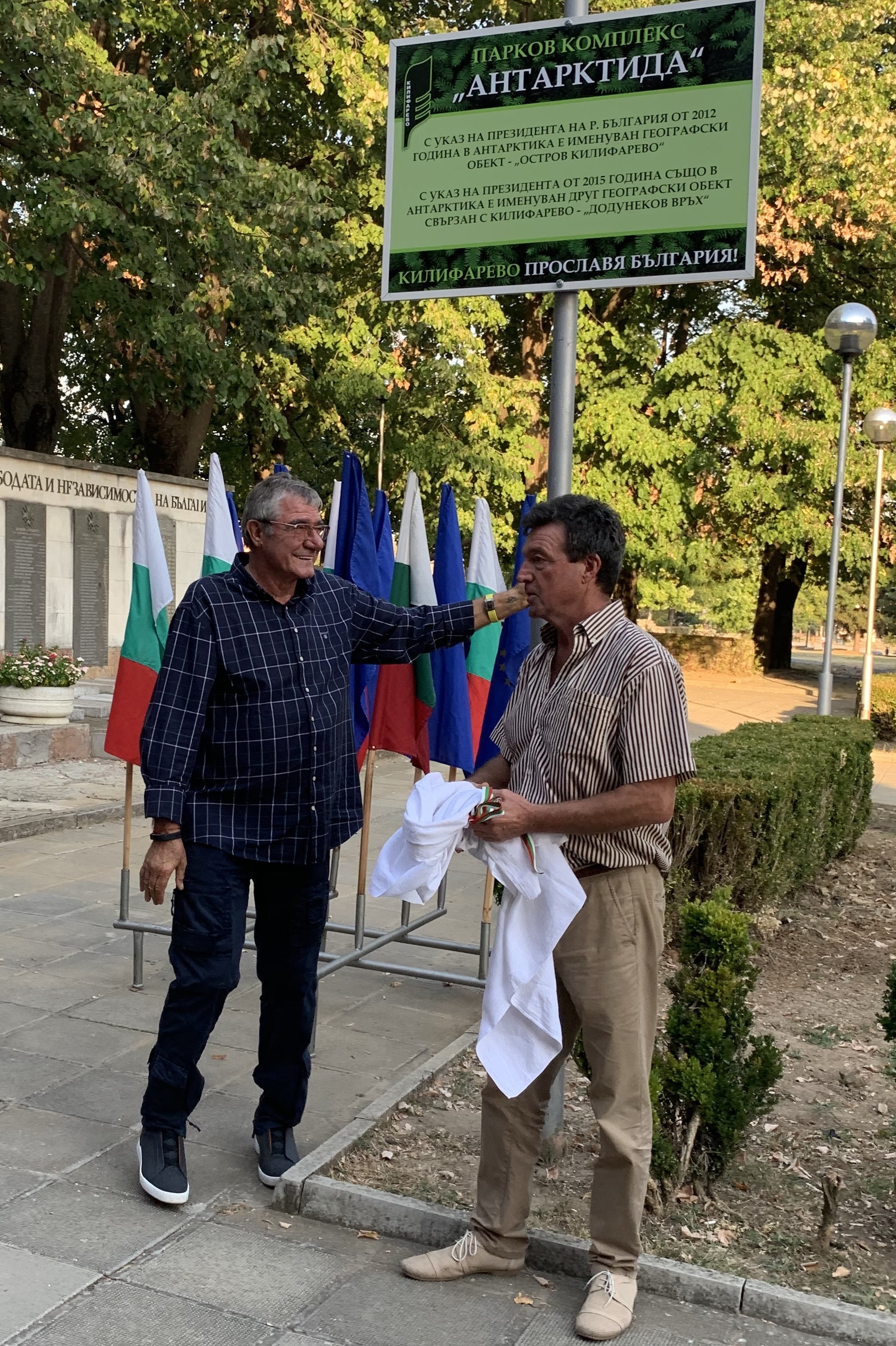
Naming ceremony for Antarctica Park in Kilifarevo, Bulgaria; left to right Bulgarian Antarctic Programme's Christo Pimpirev and Mayor Dimitar Sabev

The Antarctic Place-names Commission was established by the Bulgarian Antarctic Institute in 1994, and since 2001 has been a body affiliated with the Ministry of Foreign Affairs of Bulgaria.

The Commission approves Bulgarian place names in Antarctica, which are formally given by the President of the Republic according to the Bulgarian Constitution (Art. 98) and the established international practice.

== Bulgarian names in Antarctica ==
Geographical names in Antarctica reflect the history and practice of Antarctic exploration. The nations involved in Antarctic research give new names to nameless geographical features for the purposes of orientation, logistics, and international scientific cooperation. As of 2025, there are some 20,310 named Antarctic geographical features, including 1,610 features with names given by Bulgaria. Since the Bulgarian Antarctic base is situated in the South Shetland Islands, most of the Bulgarian place names are concentrated in that area too, especially on Livingston Island, Greenwich Island, Robert Island, Snow Island, and Smith Island. However, two early Bulgarian names were given even in 1989 (by the then State Council, a collegial presidency) to geographical features on Alexander Island in relation to field work carried out on that island by the first Bulgarian Antarctic expedition during the 1987/88 season.

== Toponymic guidelines ==
In 1995 the Commission developed its own Toponymic Guidelines defining the relevant types of geographical features, specific elements of geographical names, inappropriate names, criteria of names approval, language and spelling, and names approval procedures. In particular, the Guidelines introduced the Streamlined System that was subsequently adopted as the official national system for the Romanization of Bulgarian, eventually becoming part of Bulgarian law by way of the 2009 Transliteration Act, and endorsed also by UN in 2012 and by the US and UK in 2013.

In its practice, the Antarctic Place-names Commission has been giving priority to the following Antarctic geographic areas and features:

- Areas where the new names would be possibly helpful to potential users: scientists (planning and carrying out field work, publications etc.), cartographers, logisticians, navigators, tourists, mountaineers etc.;
- Areas with a concentration of notable nameless features;
- Features of large dimension or otherwise significant geographically;
- Features actually or potentially important in the course of field work (Bulgarian or by other nations) or other uses (transportation, tourism, search and rescue etc.);
- Features newly emerged as a result of glacier retreat or disintegration (islands, passages, peninsulas, capes, points, bays, coves).

The Commission only considers for possible naming features that are nameless, well identified and provided with detailed standardized descriptions.

== Surveys and mapping ==
The work of the Commission is supported by geographical information and mapping resulting from topographic surveys in Antarctica, such as the 1995/96 survey in Livingston Island, and the topographic survey Tangra 2004/05. Field work carried out during the latter survey has been noted by Discovery Channel, the Natural History Museum, the Royal Collection and the British Antarctic Survey as a timeline event in Antarctic exploration.

The Commission published the first Bulgarian topographic map of Livingston Island and Greenwich Island in 2005, and jointly with the Military Topographic Service of the Bulgarian Army, the first detailed topographic map of Smith Island in 2009.

== International cooperation ==
The Antarctic Place-names Commission cooperates with other national authorities for Antarctic place names, and with the Scientific Committee on Antarctic Research (SCAR). Details of the Bulgarian Antarctic toponyms are published by the Commission's website, and also by the international Composite Gazetteer of Antarctica maintained by SCAR. The names are featured by various maps, including the SCAR Antarctic Digital Database (ADD).

== Antarctic names in Bulgaria ==
In order to promote Antarctic exploration and the presence of Bulgaria in Antarctica, the Commission encourages Bulgarian municipalities to give relevant Antarctic names to public places. Several squares and streets in Bulgarian settlements are named after Livingston Island, such as Livingston Island Square in Samuil and Kula; Livingston Island Street in Gotse Delchev, Yambol, Petrich, Lovech, Vidin and Sofia; Antarctica Street in Dzhebel and Sofia, and Antarctica Park in Kilifarevo. and Tangra Mountains Street, Krumov Kamak Street, Perunika Glacier Street, Rogosh Glacier Street and Opalchenie Peak Street in Sofia.

== See also ==
- SCAR Composite Gazetteer of Antarctica
- Bulgarian toponyms in Antarctica

== Maps ==
- Antarctic Digital Database (ADD). Scale 1:250000 topographic map of Antarctica with place-name search. Scientific Committee on Antarctic Research (SCAR). Since 1993, regularly upgraded and updated.
- L.L. Ivanov. St. Kliment Ohridski Base, Livingston Island. Scale 1:1000 topographic map. Sofia: Antarctic Place-names Commission of Bulgaria, 1996. (The first Bulgarian Antarctic topographic map, in Bulgarian and English)
- L.L. Ivanov. Livingston Island: Central-Eastern Region. Scale 1:25000 topographic map. Sofia: Antarctic Place-names Commission of Bulgaria, 1996.
- L.L. Ivanov et al. Antarctica: Livingston Island and Greenwich Island, South Shetland Islands (from English Strait to Morton Strait, with illustrations and ice-cover distribution). Scale 1:100000 topographic map. Sofia: Antarctic Place-names Commission of Bulgaria, 2005.
- L.L. Ivanov. Antarctica: Livingston Island and Greenwich, Robert, Snow and Smith Islands. Scale 1:120000 topographic map. Troyan: Manfred Wörner Foundation, 2009. (in Bulgarian) ISBN 978-954-92032-4-0 (Updated second edition 2010. ISBN 978-954-92032-8-8)
- L.L. Ivanov. Antarctica: Livingston Island and Greenwich, Robert, Snow and Smith Islands. Scale 1:120000 topographic map. Troyan: Manfred Wörner Foundation, 2010. ISBN 978-954-92032-9-5 (First edition 2009. ISBN 978-954-92032-6-4)

== Bibliography ==
- J. Stewart. Antarctica: An Encyclopedia. Jefferson, N.C. and London: McFarland, 2011. 1771 pp. ISBN 978-0-7864-3590-6
- L. Ivanov. Bulgarian Names in Antarctica. Sofia: Manfred Wörner Foundation, 2021. Second edition. 539 pp. ISBN 978-619-90008-5-4 (in Bulgarian)
- G. Bakardzhieva. Bulgarian toponyms in Antarctica. Paisiy Hilendarski University of Plovdiv: Research Papers. Vol. 56, Book 1, Part A, 2018 – Languages and Literature, pp. 104–119 (in Bulgarian)
