= Macy Glacier =

Glacier in Antarctica

- Location of Tangra Mountains on Livingston Island in the South Shetland Islands

- Location within South Shetland Islands Location within Antarctica
- Location: Livingston Island; South Shetland Islands
- Coordinates: 62°41′20″S 60°08′10″W
- Length: 3.7 nautical miles (6.9 km; 4.3 mi)
- Width: 1.4 nautical miles (2.6 km; 1.6 mi)
- Thickness: unknown
- Terminus: Brunow Bay
- Status: unknown

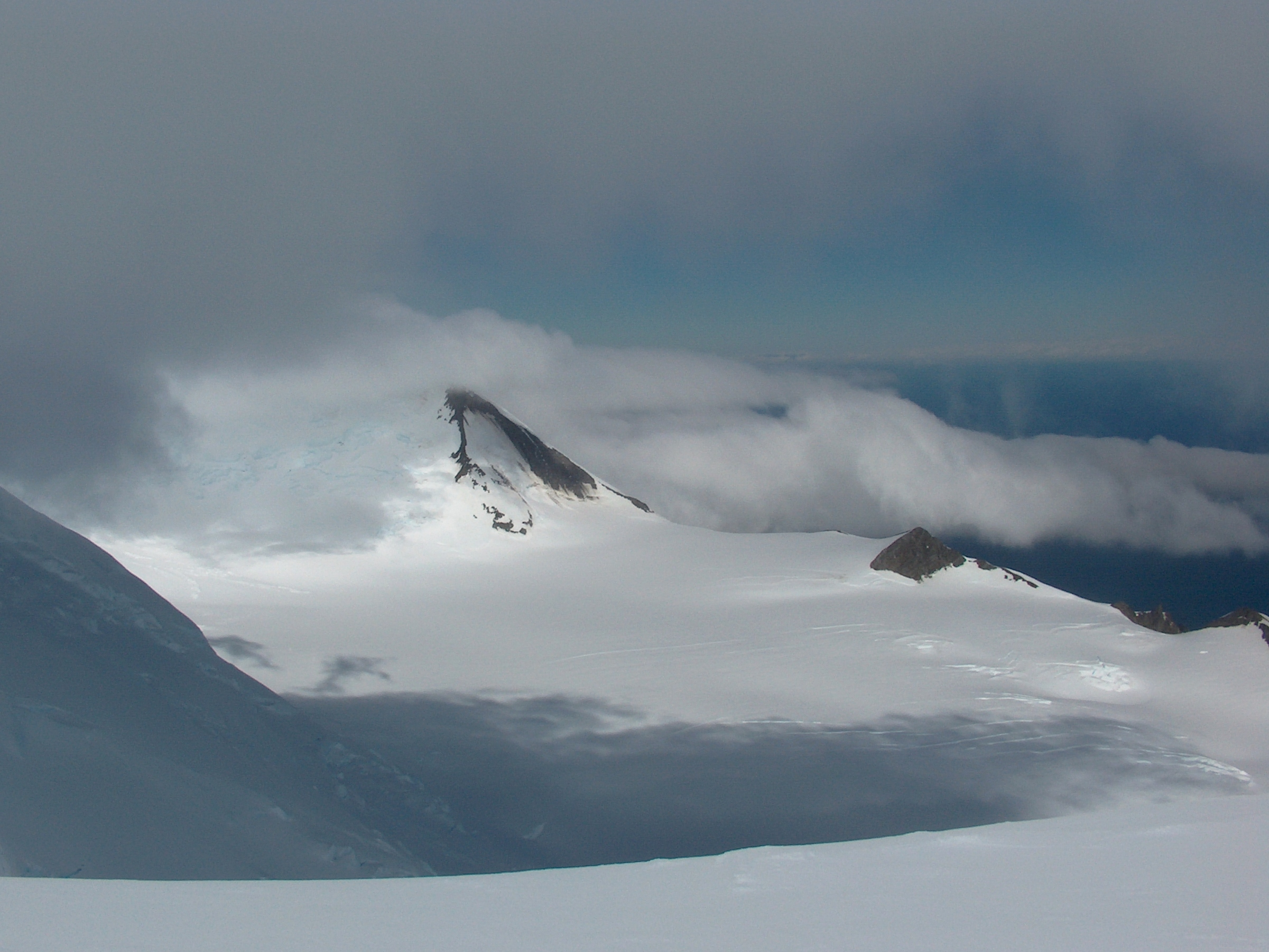
Upper Macy Glacier from Catalunyan Saddle, Tangra Mountains.

Topographic map of Livingston Island and Smith Island

Macy Glacier is a 3.7 nautical miles (6.9 km; 4.3 mi) long and 1.4 nautical miles (2.6 km; 1.6 mi) crescent-shaped glacier on the southern slopes of the Tangra Mountains, Livingston Island in the South Shetland Islands, Antarctica. The glacier is bounded by Friesland Ridge to the northwest, Levski Ridge to the northeast and Peshev Ridge to the southeast, and flows southwestwards into the head of Brunow Bay.

The feature was named by the UK Antarctic Place-names Committee in 1958 for Robert Macy, Master of the brig Aurora, one of the fleet of American sealers from New York which visited the South Shetland Islands in 1820–21.

== Location ==
The glacier's midpoint is located at 62°41′20″S 60°08′10″W (British mapping in 1968, and Bulgarian in 2005 and 2009).

== See also ==
- List of glaciers in the Antarctic
- Glaciology

== Maps ==
- L.L. Ivanov et al. Antarctica: Livingston Island and Greenwich Island, South Shetland Islands. Scale 1:100000 topographic map. Sofia: Antarctic Place-names Commission of Bulgaria, 2005.
- L.L. Ivanov. Antarctica: Livingston Island and Greenwich, Robert, Snow and Smith Islands. Scale 1:120000 topographic map. Troyan: Manfred Wörner Foundation, 2009. ISBN 978-954-92032-6-4
- A. Kamburov and L. Ivanov. Bowles Ridge and Central Tangra Mountains: Livingston Island, Antarctica. Scale 1:25000 map. Sofia: Manfred Wörner Foundation, 2023. ISBN 978-619-90008-6-1
