= Svelten Peak =

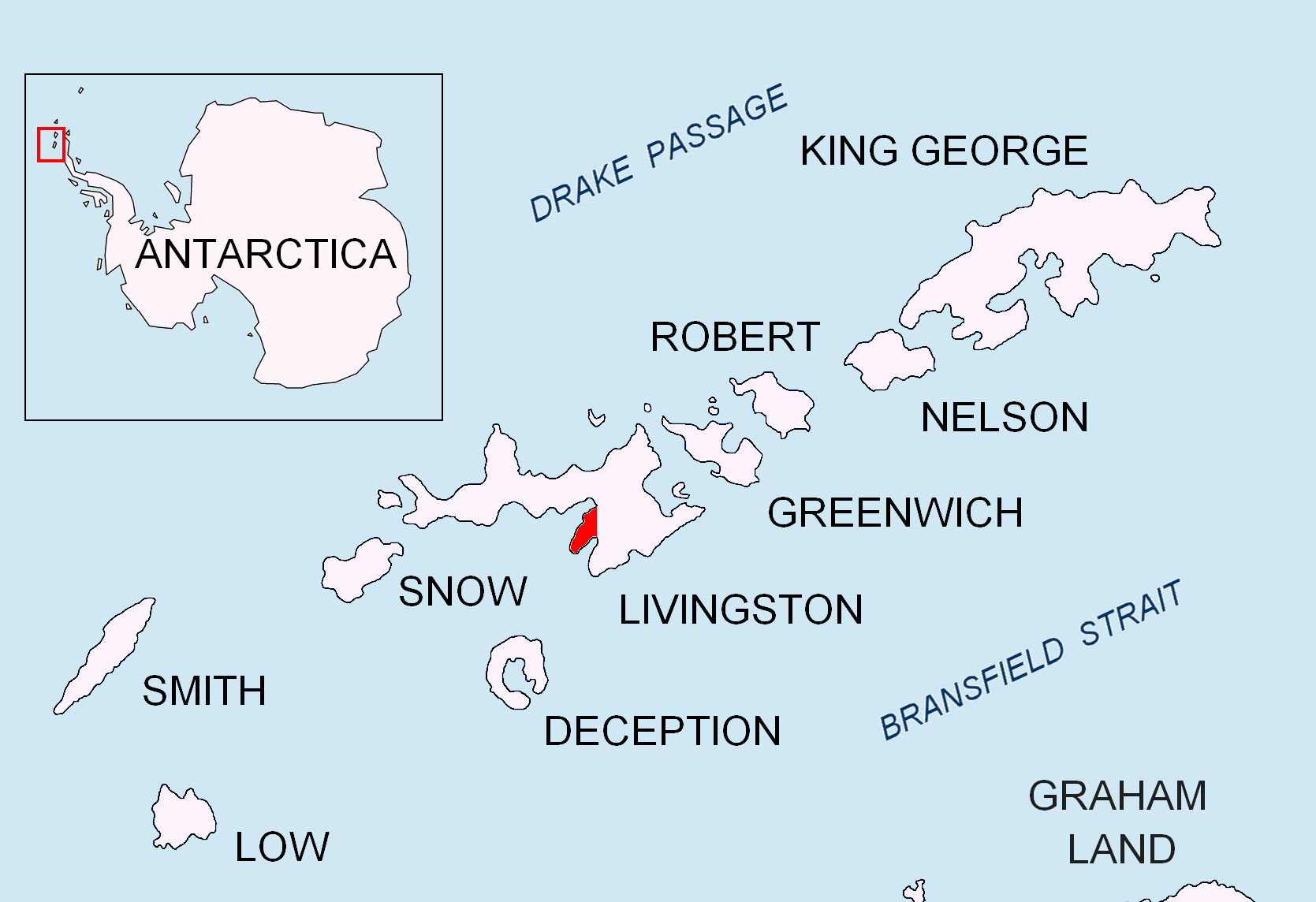
Location of Hurd Peninsula on Livingston Island in the South Shetland Islands.

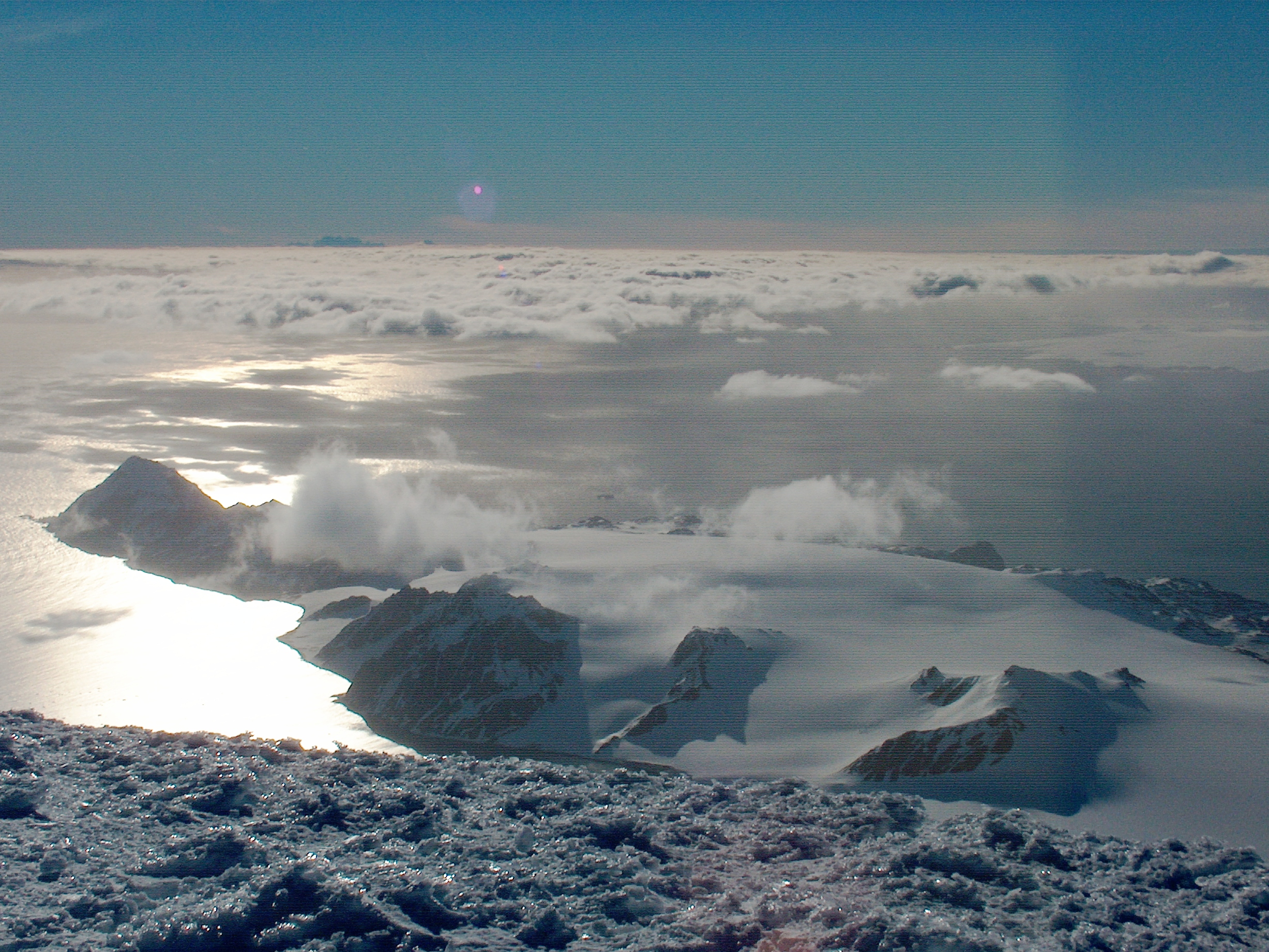
Svelten Peak (second left) from Mount Friesland.

Topographic map of Livingston Island featuring the peak.

Svelten Peak is a sharp peak rising to 300 m on Hurd Peninsula, Livingston Island in the South Shetland Islands, Antarctica and surmounting False Bay to the southeast. It is the summit of the 600 m long, narrow and rocky Querchan Ridge descending southeastwards to the seashore.

The peak is named by personnel of the nearby Spanish base Juan Carlos Primero and appears in the 2009 Bulgarian map of Livingston Island.

== Location ==
The peak is located at 62°41′30″S 60°21′20″W which is 430 m southeast of Pirámide Peak, 670 m west-southwest of Moores Peak, 4.01 km north-northwest of Canetti Peak, 2.17 km east-northeast of MacGregor Peaks and 1.57 km east of Castellvi Peak (Spanish mapping in 1991 and Bulgarian in 2009).

== Map ==
- Isla Livingston: Península Hurd. Mapa topográfico de escala 1:25000. Madrid: Servicio Geográfico del Ejército, 1991. (Map reproduced on p. 16 of the linked work)
- Antarctic Digital Database (ADD). Scale 1:250000 topographic map of Antarctica. Scientific Committee on Antarctic Research (SCAR). Since 1993, regularly upgraded and updated.
- L.L. Ivanov. Antarctica: Livingston Island and Smith Island. Scale 1:100000 topographic map. Manfred Wörner Foundation, 2017. ISBN 978-619-90008-3-0
