= Buena Nueva Cove =

Small open cove in the South Shetland Islands, Antarctica

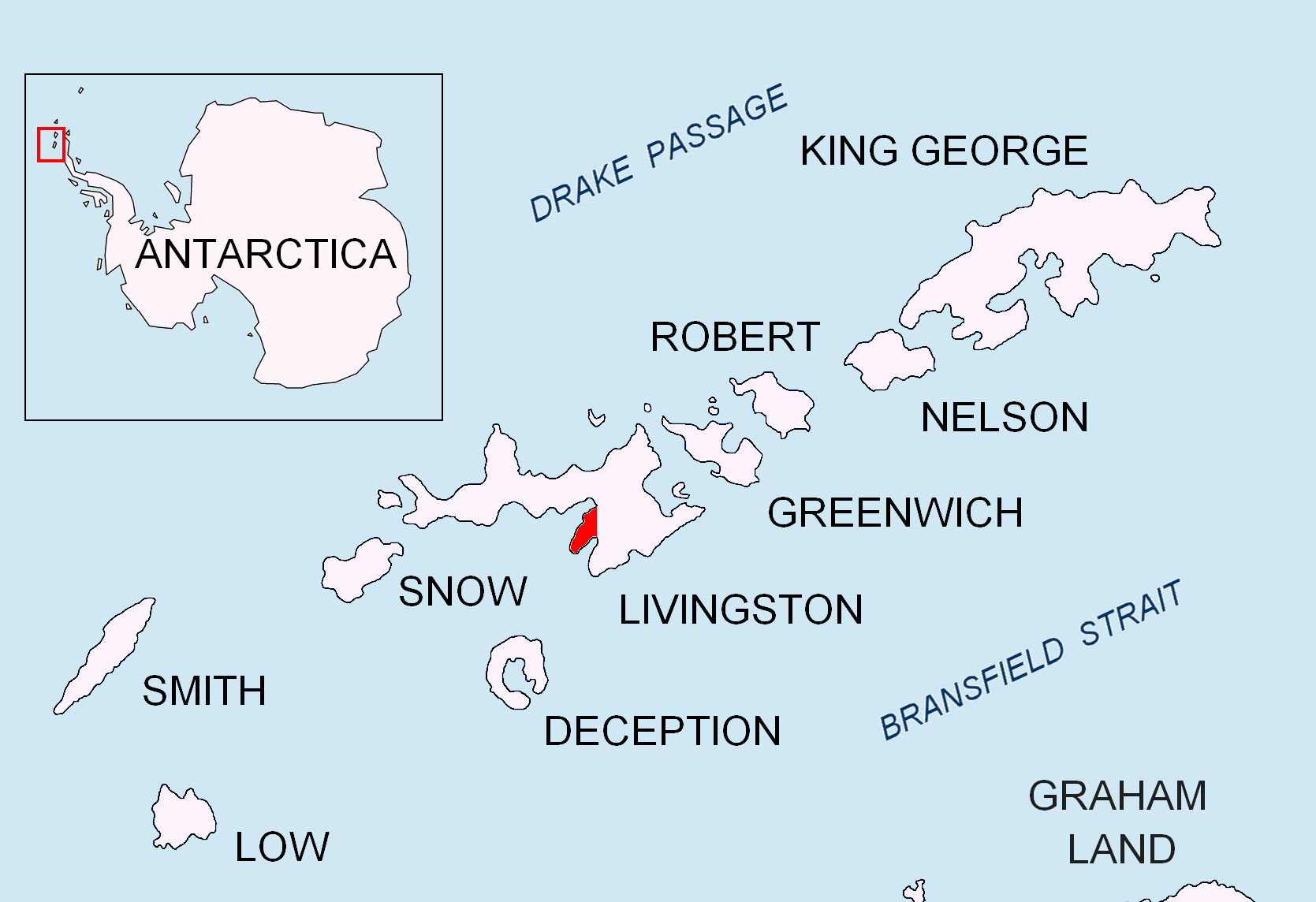
Location of Hurd Peninsula on Livingston Island in the South Shetland Islands.

Topographic map of Livingston Island and Smith Island.

Buena Nueva Cove is a small open cove, 900 m wide and indenting for 200 m the northwest coast of False Bay, Livingston Island in the South Shetland Islands, Antarctica southeast of MacGregor Peaks and east of Castro Peak on Hurd Peninsula. The area was visited by early 19th century sealers.

The feature is named after the ship Buena Nueva in which the Spanish navigator Gabriel de Castilla made his voyage south of Drake Passage in 1603.

== Location ==
The cove's midpoint is located at 62°42′16.2″S 60°23′10.5″W which is 3.03 km northeast of Miers Bluff and 2.9 km west-northwest of Ogosta Point, Rozhen Peninsula (British mapping in and 1968, detailed Spanish mapping in 1991, and Bulgarian mapping in 2005 and 2009).

== Maps ==
- Isla Livingston: Península Hurd. Mapa topográfico de escala 1:25000. Madrid: Servicio Geográfico del Ejército, 1991. (Map reproduced on p. 16 of the linked work)
- L.L. Ivanov et al. Antarctica: Livingston Island and Greenwich Island, South Shetland Islands. Scale 1:100000 topographic map. Sofia: Antarctic Place-names Commission of Bulgaria, 2005.
- L.L. Ivanov. Antarctica: Livingston Island and Greenwich, Robert, Snow and Smith Islands. Scale 1:120000 topographic map. Troyan: Manfred Wörner Foundation, 2009. ISBN 978-954-92032-6-4
- Antarctic Digital Database (ADD). Scale 1:250000 topographic map of Antarctica. Scientific Committee on Antarctic Research (SCAR). Since 1993, regularly upgraded and updated.
- L.L. Ivanov. Antarctica: Livingston Island and Smith Island. Scale 1:100000 topographic map. Manfred Wörner Foundation, 2017. ISBN 978-619-90008-3-0
