= Pirámide Peak =

Location of Livingston Island in the South Shetland Islands.

Topographic map of Livingston Island and Smith Island.

Pirámide Peak is a sharp rocky peak rising to 366 m at the southeast edge of Hurd Ice Cap on Hurd Peninsula, Livingston Island in the South Shetland Islands, Antarctica and surmounting False Bay to the southeast.

The peak is descriptively named by personnel of the nearby Spanish base Juan Carlos Primero and appears in the 2009 Bulgarian map of Livingston Island.

== Location ==
The peak is located at 62°41′20.6″S 60°21′42.5″W which is 710 m south-southeast of Dorotea Point, 2.33 km south-southeast of Mount Reina Sofía, 1.41 km southwest of Mirador Hill, 930 m west of Moores Peak, 430 m northwest of Svelten Peak, 4.42 km north-northwest of Canetti Peak, 4.49 km northeast of Binn Peak and 1.31 km west-southwest of Castellvi Peak (Spanish mapping in 1991 and Bulgarian in 2009).

== Maps ==
- Isla Livingston: Península Hurd. Mapa topográfico de escala 1:25000. Madrid: Servicio Geográfico del Ejército, 1991. (Map reproduced on p. 16 of the linked work)
- Antarctic Digital Database (ADD). Scale 1:250000 topographic map of Antarctica. Scientific Committee on Antarctic Research (SCAR). Since 1993, regularly upgraded and updated.
- L.L. Ivanov. Antarctica: Livingston Island and Smith Island. Scale 1:100000 topographic map. Manfred Wörner Foundation, 2017. ISBN 978-619-90008-3-0
