= Glaciar Rocoso Cove =

Cove in the South Shetland Islands, Antarctica

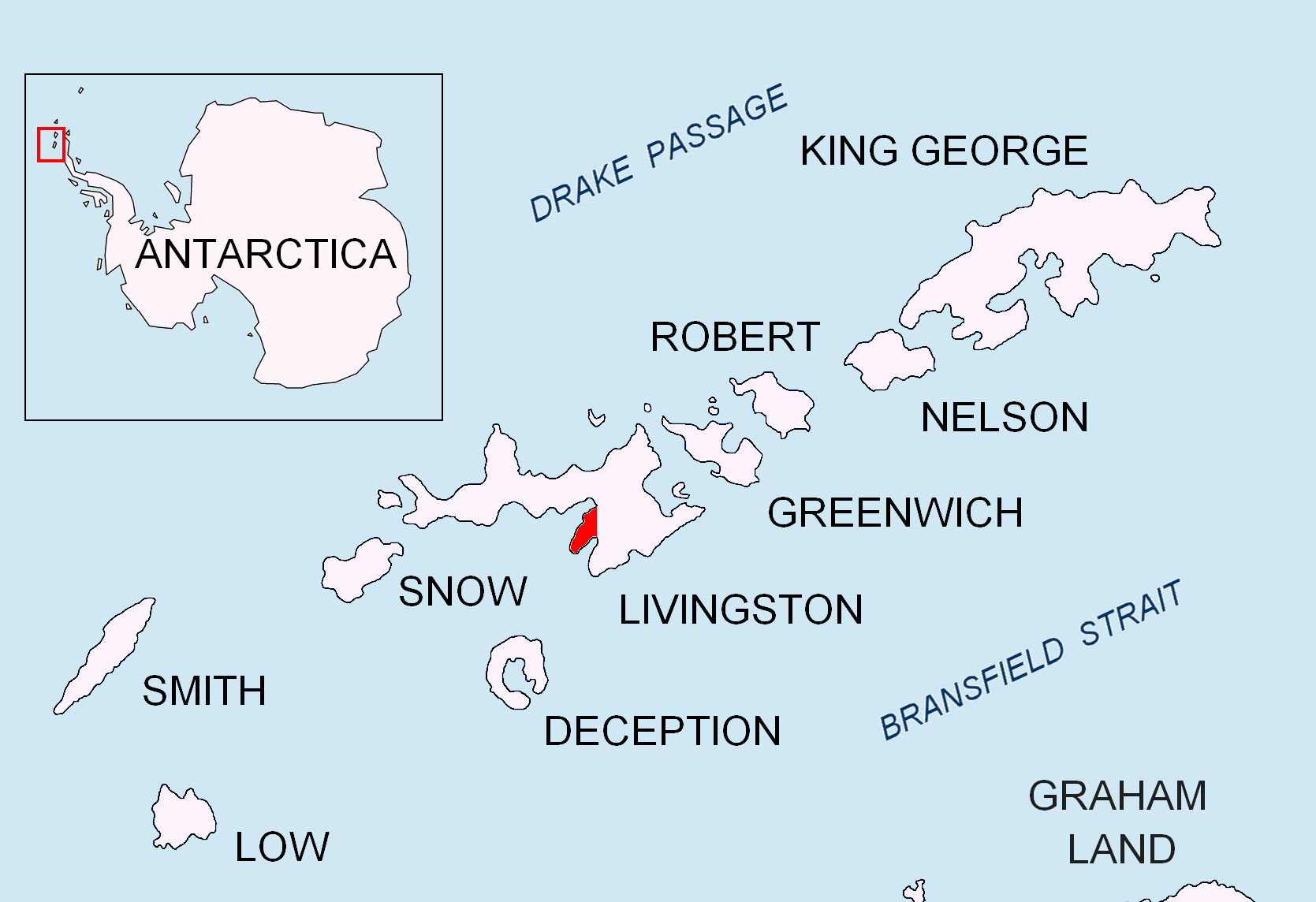
Location of Hurd Peninsula on Livingston Island in the South Shetland Islands.

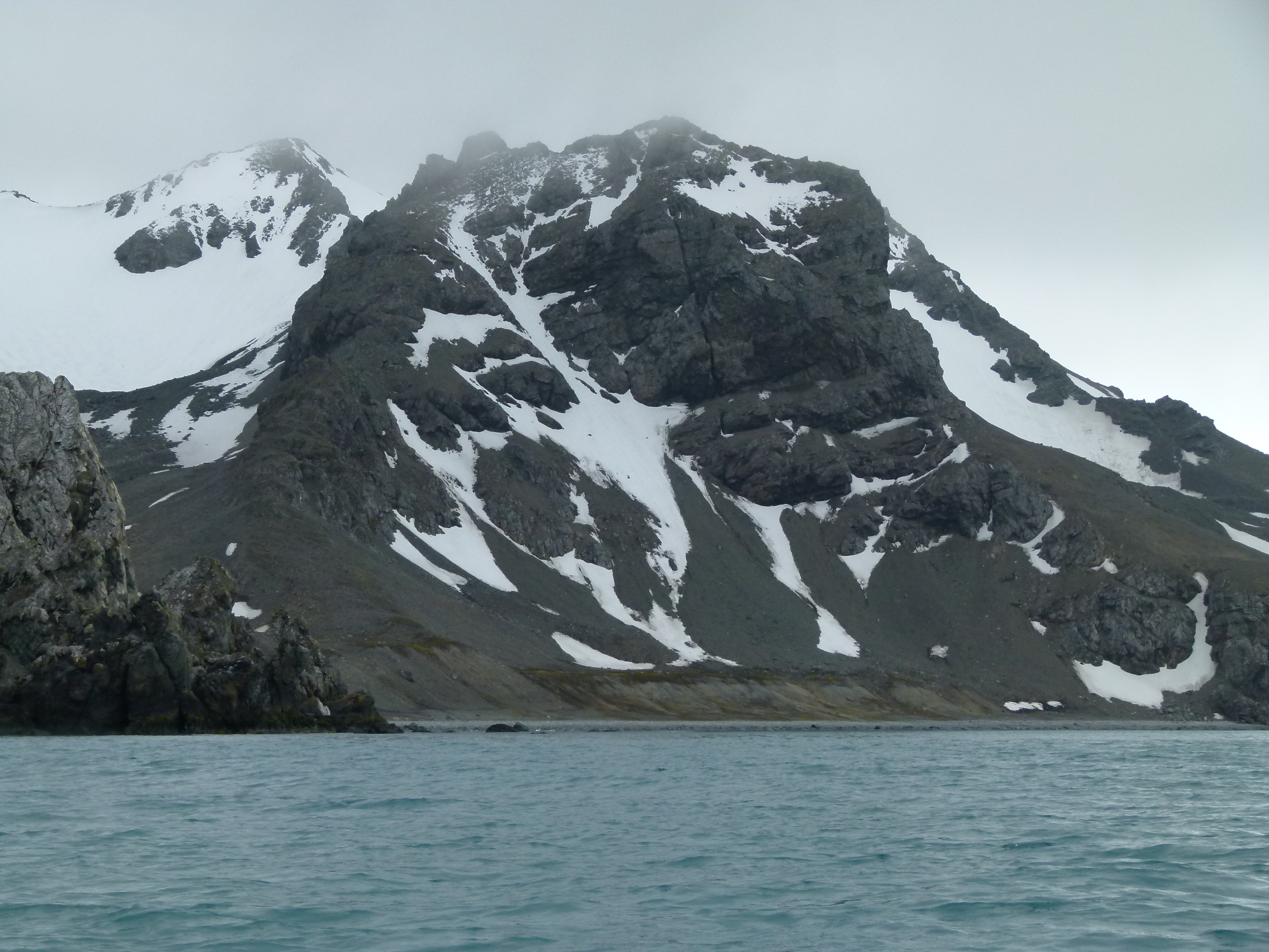
Glaciar Rocoso Cove surmounted by Nusha Hill, with Doc Peak in the background.

Topographic map of Livingston Island and Smith Island.

Glaciar Rocoso Cove is a small open cove, part of False Bay, Livingston Island in the South Shetland Islands, Antarctica. It is 920 m wide and indenting for 180 m the southeast coast of Hurd Peninsula east-northeast of Binn Peak and south-southwest of Nusha Hill. The area was visited by early 19th century sealers.

The cove is descriptively named by Spain in connection with a rock glacier draining into it.

== Location ==
The feature's midpoint is located at 62°42′50.2″S 60°24′22.9″W which is 1.6 km northeast of Miers Bluff and 3.85 km west-southwest of Ogosta Point, Rozhen Peninsula (British mapping in 1968, detailed Spanish mapping in 1991, and Bulgarian mapping in 2005 and 2009).

== Maps ==
- Isla Livingston: Península Hurd. Mapa topográfico de escala 1:25000. Madrid: Servicio Geográfico del Ejército, 1991. (Map reproduced on p. 16 of the linked work)
- L.L. Ivanov et al. Antarctica: Livingston Island and Greenwich Island, South Shetland Islands. Scale 1:100000 topographic map. Sofia: Antarctic Place-names Commission of Bulgaria, 2005.
- L.L. Ivanov. Antarctica: Livingston Island and Greenwich, Robert, Snow and Smith Islands. Scale 1:120000 topographic map. Troyan: Manfred Wörner Foundation, 2009. ISBN 978-954-92032-6-4
- Antarctic Digital Database (ADD). Scale 1:250000 topographic map of Antarctica. Scientific Committee on Antarctic Research (SCAR). Since 1993, regularly upgraded and updated.
- L.L. Ivanov. Antarctica: Livingston Island and Smith Island. Scale 1:100000 topographic map. Manfred Wörner Foundation, 2017. ISBN 978-619-90008-3-0
