= Nusha Hill =

Rocky hill in the South Shetland Islands, Antarctica

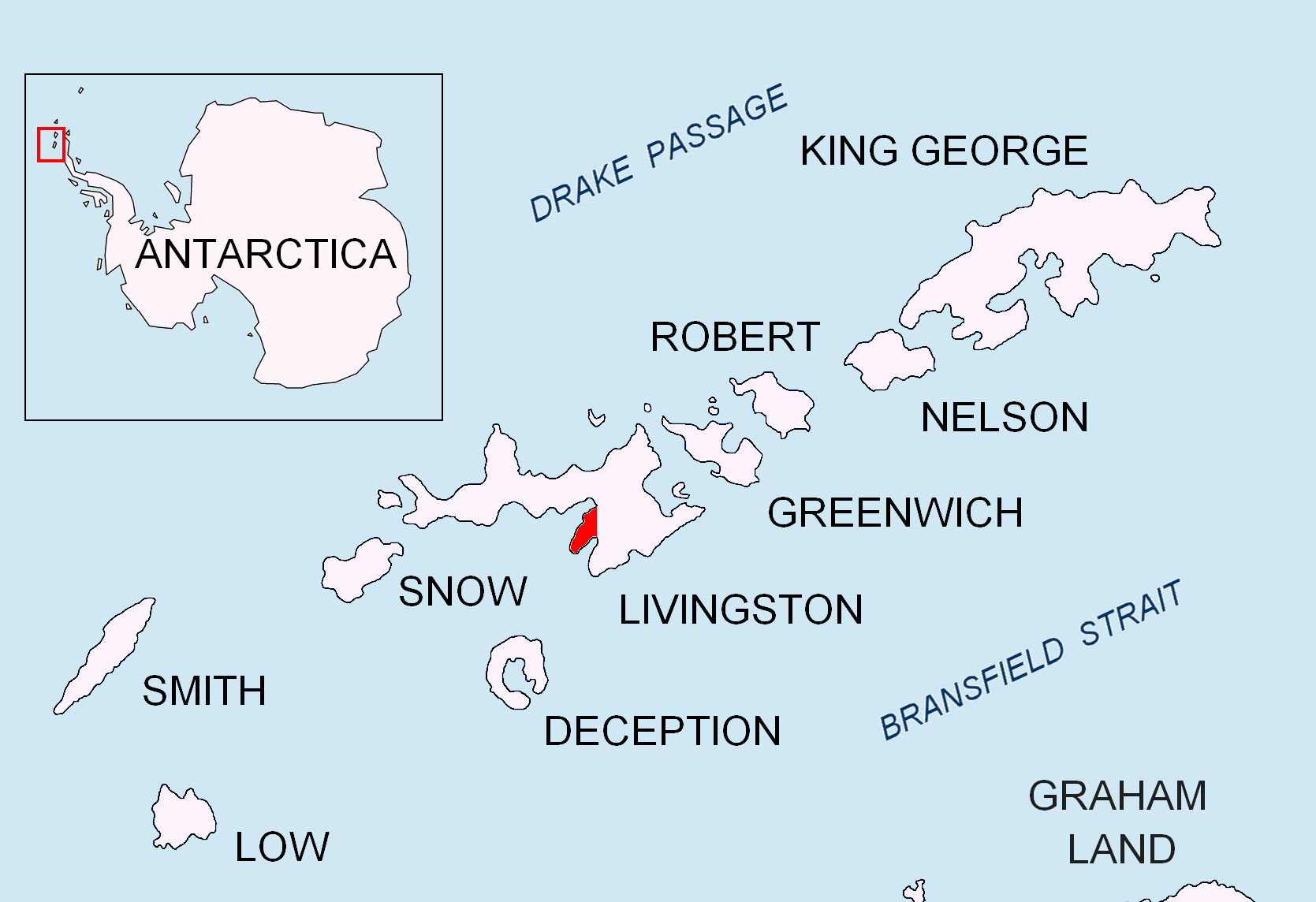
Location of Hurd Peninsula on Livingston Island in the South Shetland Islands

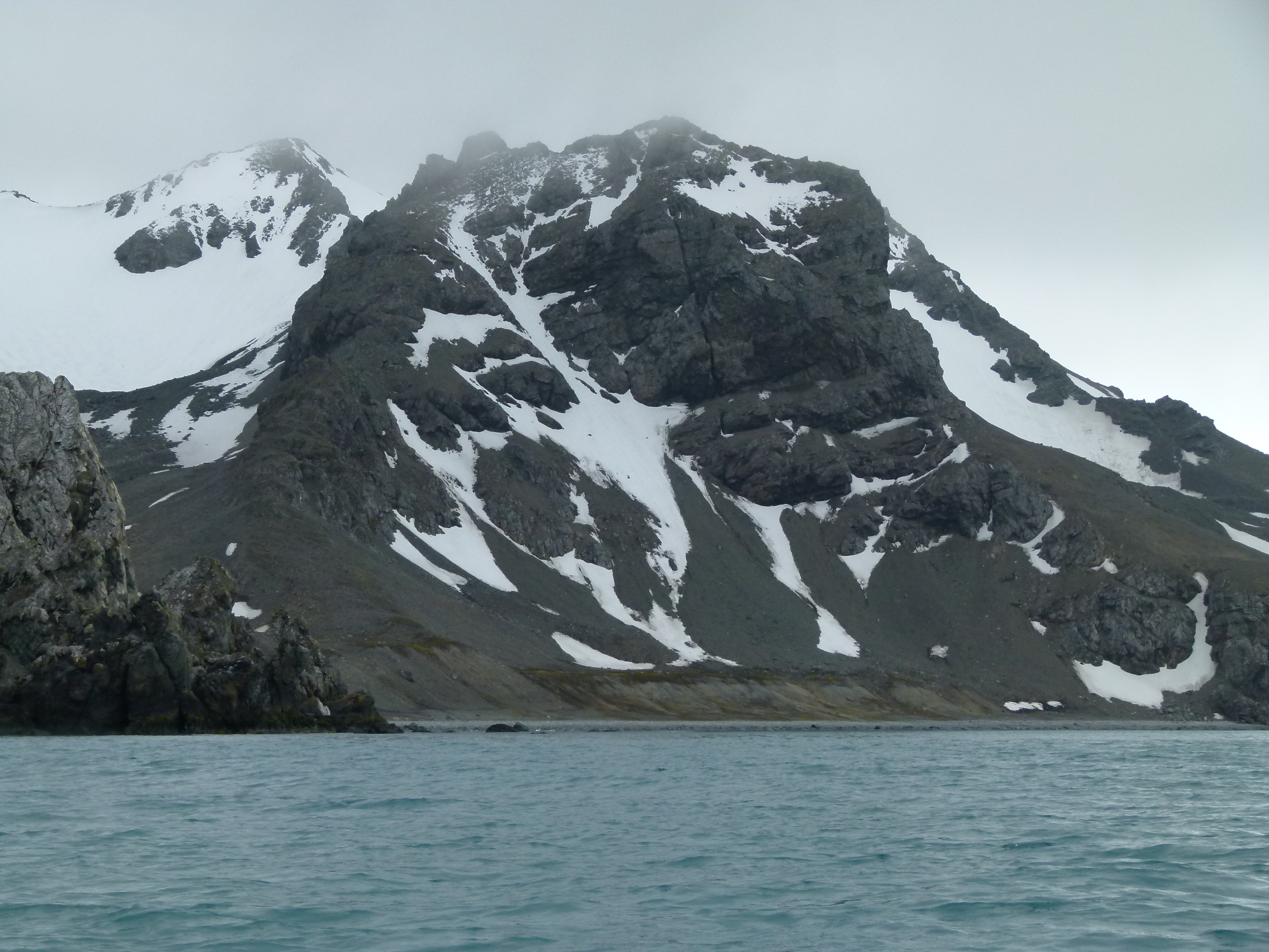
Nusha Hill from False Bay with Castro Peak in the background

Topographic map of Livingston Island featuring Nusha Hill

Nusha Hill (Bulgarian: Нушин хълм, ‘Nushin Halm’ \'nu-shin 'h&lm\) is the rocky hill rising to 251 m in southern Hurd Peninsula on Livingston Island in the South Shetland Islands, Antarctica. It has precipitous east, south and west slopes, and is linked to Doc Peak (301 m) to the north by a col of elevation 220 m. Nusha Hill surmounts a rock glacier to the west and southwest, False Bay to the east and its sub-embayment Glaciar Rocoso Cove to the south-southwest. The adjacent area, subject to geological and glaciological field work, is accessible by sea or by an overland route running from Hurd Ice Cap along the South Bay coast facing Sally Rocks and via a saddle of elevation 122 m situated 800 m west by south of the hill.

The feature is named after Nusha Ivanova (b. 1986), participant in the 2002/03 and subsequent Bulgarian Antarctic campaigns (the first Bulgarian high school student involved).

== Location ==
Nusha Hill is located at 62°42′32.5″S 60°24′06″W, which is 1.5 km northeast of Binn Peak, 400 m south of Doc Peak, 450 m south-southwest of Castro Peak, and 4.51 km west-northwest of Canetti Peak on Rozhen Peninsula. British mapping of the area in 1968, Bulgarian in 2005, 2009 and 2017, and detailed Spanish mapping in 1991.

== Maps ==
- Isla Livingston: Península Hurd. Mapa topográfico de escala 1:25000. Madrid: Servicio Geográfico del Ejército, 1991. (Map reproduced on p. 16 of the linked work)
- L.L. Ivanov et al. Antarctica: Livingston Island and Greenwich Island, South Shetland Islands. Scale 1:100000 topographic map. Sofia: Antarctic Place-names Commission of Bulgaria, 2005
- L.L. Ivanov. Antarctica: Livingston Island and Greenwich, Robert, Snow and Smith Islands. Scale 1:120000 topographic map. Troyan: Manfred Wörner Foundation, 2009. ISBN 978-954-92032-6-4
- Antarctic Digital Database (ADD). Scale 1:250000 topographic map of Antarctica. Scientific Committee on Antarctic Research (SCAR). Since 1993, regularly upgraded and updated
- L.L. Ivanov. Antarctica: Livingston Island and Smith Island. Scale 1:100000 topographic map. Manfred Wörner Foundation, 2017. ISBN 978-619-90008-3-0
