= Josefina Castellví =

Spanish biologist, oceanographer and writer (1935–2026)

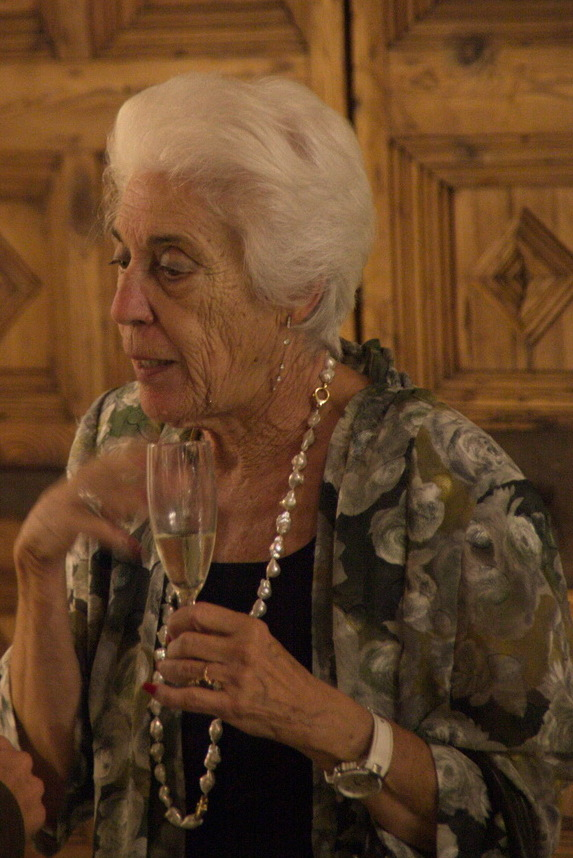
- Castellví in 2014
- Born: Josefina Castellví Piulachs; 1 July 1935; Barcelona, Spain
- Died: 2 February 2026 (aged 90)
- Education: University of Barcelona
- Awards: Creu de Sant Jordi Award
- Scientific career
- Fields: Oceanography

Josefina Castellví Piulachs (1 July 1935 – 2 February 2026), known as Pepita Castellví, was a Spanish oceanographer, biologist and writer. Castellvi Peak on Hurd Peninsula, on Livingston Island in Antarctica is named in her honour. In 1984 she was the first Spaniard to participate in an international expedition to Antarctica. She received her bachelor's degree in 1957 and a PhD in biological sciences at the University of Barcelona in 1969. In 1960 she started working for the Institut de Ciències del Mar in Barcelona. In addition, she conducted research at the Spanish National Research Council (CSIC) and was a delegate in Catalonia for two years (1984–1986).

Starting in 1984, she participated in the Organization of Research in Antarctica and assisted with the installation of the Juan Carlos I Antarctic Base on Livingston Island, of which she was the lead oceanographer from 1989 to 1997, replacing Antoni Ballester. From 1989 to 1995 she directed Madrid's National Program of Antarctic Research, and later, from 1994 to 1995, she directed the Institute of Marine Sciences.

Castellví was awarded, among other prizes like the Gold Medal of the Generalitat of Catalonia in 1994, the Creu de Sant Jordi Award in 2003, the IEC Environment Prize in 2006 and the CONCA National Award in 2013.

== Life and career ==
Josefina Castellví was born the daughter of a doctor and housewife in Barcelona during the last few months of the Spanish Republic before the explosive outbreak of the Spanish Civil War (1936–1939). She studied at the Montserrat Institute and in 1957 graduated with a degree in biology from the University of Barcelona. In 1960 she specialized in oceanography from the Sorbonne. In 1969, Josefina got a doctorate in science from the University of Barcelona.

Castellví and her older sister attended school at an exceptionally young age near Eixample, where their family began. Later, they were transferred to a convent school, where they studied until their second year of high school. Ultimately, they completed their basic studies at the Institute Monsterrat, in the neighborhood of Sant Gervasi, where Josefina prepared to enter university. In spite of living in a postwar period and the immense poverty the country suffered, Josefina's childhood and adolescence were normal; she lived alternately in Barcelona and Castelldefels, where her parents had a house.

In 1953, around the age of 18, Josefina began studying biology at the University of Barcelona. She completed two tracks in one and graduated in 1957, when she was 22 years old. Only two people finished the degree that year: Josefina and a nun. She continued her studies in order to engage more deeply with her research.

After finishing her degree Josefina Castellví traveled to France to study for two years. By 1960, when she specialized and received her PhD in oceanography at the age of 25, she participated in her first oceanographic expeditions on French ships and taught at the Sorbonne. Also starting that year, she began work at the Institute of Marine Sciences as Council Superior of Scientific Research, where she would later assume the role of director from 1994 to 1995 whilst also being a delegate to Catalonia. In 1984 she was the first Spanish woman to participate in an international expedition in Antarctica; it ought to be noted that she contributed mainly to those expeditions’ research, for which she was awarded recognition alongside Antonio Ballester i Nolla. Ballester was recognized as well for his intervention in the installation of the Juan Carlos I Antarctic Base on Island Livingston, of which Josefina was chief director from 1989 to 1993, allowing Spain for the first time to become a member of the Antarctic Treaty System (1988).

When she returned to Barcelona, Josefina continued her research at the Spanish National Research Council (CSIC). First, by experimenting in the laboratory, since at that time Spain lacked oceanographic vessels and bathyscaphes with which to feasibly and directly explore the seas. When, in 1971, scientists provided the first Spanish oceanographic vessel for use in investigations Josefina Castellví was able to do her work from within the environment of her scientific subjects and could analyze how those subjects behaved in the midst of the sea currents.

In 1987 Antonio Ballester, Josefina Castellví, and seven others put the first Spanish base in Antarctica, which they created on Island Livingstone and baptized with the name of Juan Carlos I. Josefina Castellví directed an Antarctic base where 12 people lived for four months a year. Josefina found the research in Antarctica to be both a great learning experience and emotionally validating. Antarctica is a natural laboratory; deep in the ice there is written billions of years of Earth's history.

In 1995, after living a few years in Madrid, where she had commissioned the National Research Program Antarctica, Josefina Castellví returned to Barcelona to lead the Institute of Marine Sciences of the CSIC. Throughout her working life, she combined her research with conference work in order to disseminate her findings and her books, one of which was a book published in 1996 titled I Have lived in Antarctica.

In 1994 she received the Gold Medal of Generalitat of Catalonia and in 2003 she received the Creu de Sant Jordi. The Gold Medal is an honorary distinction awarded annually by the Generalitat of Catalonia to those persons or social entities who "on their merits, have provided outstanding services to Catalonia in the defense of her identity, especially at the civic and cultural level". Moreover, it is considered, together with the International Prize of Catalonia, to be one of the most prestigious distinctions granted in Catalonia. From 2010, she was the president of the Summer University of Andorra.

On 8 October 2013, she won the Culture of the Generalitat of Catalonia Award, which distinguishes those people, entities, or institutions in any field that are worthy of institutional recognition for his or her contribution to Catalan culture, with preference for excellence, innovation, trajectory and projection, and bearing in mind their contribution during the year before of the concession. In addition, on 13 May 2013 she received the Catalan of the year Award.

In 2014, she was appointed vice-president of the Advisory Council for the Sustainable Development of Catalonia (CADS).

On 5 March 2015, she received the August Pi i Sunyer Medal from the Faculty of Medicine of the University of Barcelona, in commemoration of International Women's Day. Researcher Josefina Castellví was the first woman to receive this medal. Despite her retirement in 2000, Castellví remained active; she continued to collaborate with the Advisory Council for the Sustainable Development of the Presidential Department of the Generalitat of Catalonia. She also continued to give lectures on her work in Antarctica, during which she testified to the importance of this frozen desert. As the coldest place on Earth, she said, it is ideal for studying the capacity to adapt inherent in all organisms, which must change to survive, since, if they do not, they will disappear like the trees and plants that have disappeared from Antarctica.

She was the first Catalan and Spanish female oceanographer and received many awards in recognition of her research. "The difficult part is to receive first prize", here she quoted the scientist Ramon Margalef, "because others come such as mimetic actions.” Of all the awards that she had, Josefina especially valued two: the Gold Medal of the Generalitat of Catalonia (1994) and the Creu de Sant Jordi (2003), because they represent the homage of her city and country.

Castellví continued to live on the same floor where she was born, a testament to her devotion to origins.

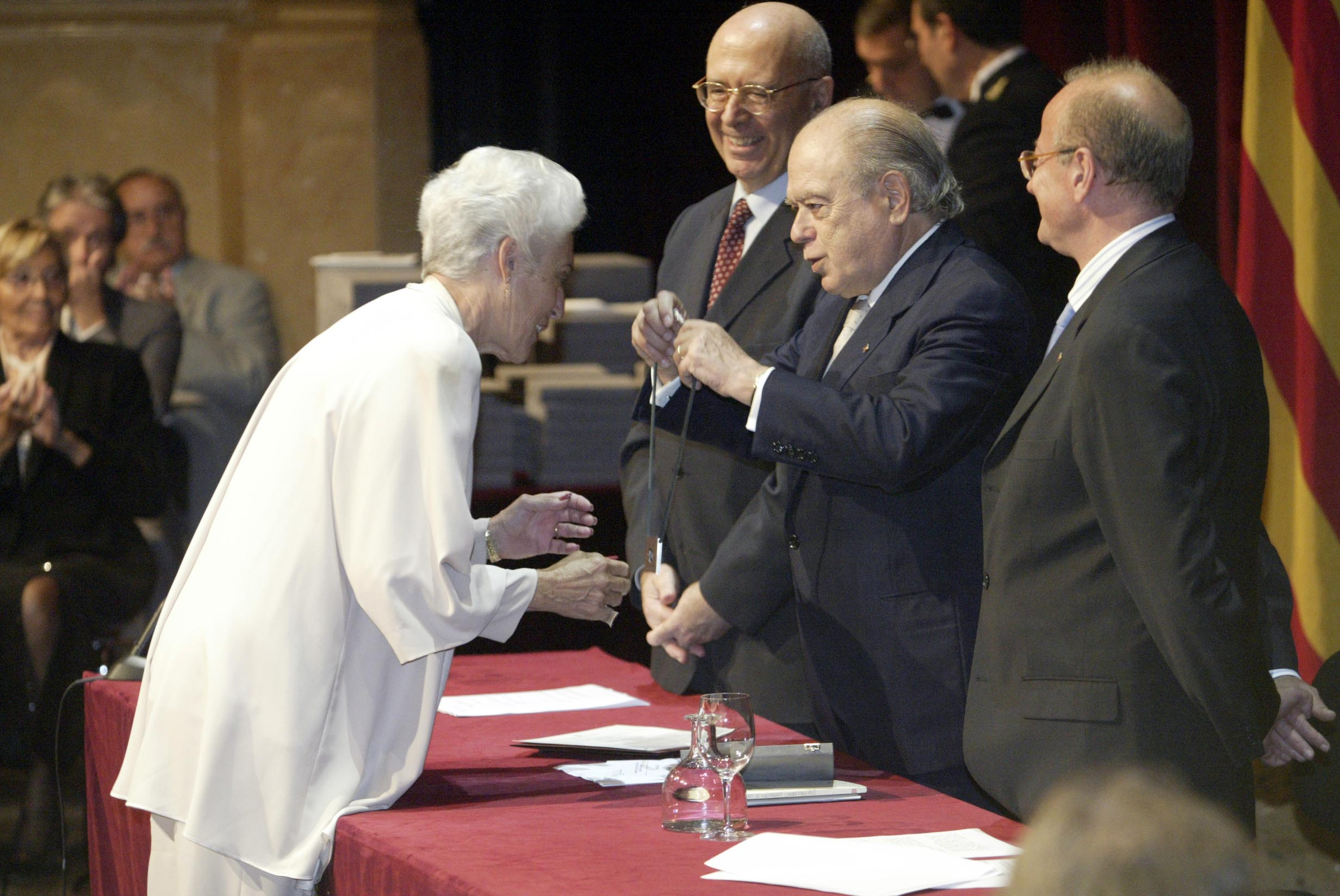
Josefina Castellví in 2003 receiving the decoration Cross of Saint Jordi.

She died on 2 February 2026, at the age of 90.

== Works ==
Castellví wrote many books, more than 70 scientific articles in national and international magazines, and chaired various international committees and commissions related to the oceans and Antarctica. Among her books are the following:

- 1967: Ecología marina
- 1996: Yo he vivido en la Antártida: Autobiographical work narrating her experience in Antarctica. In the book she explains how she directed the Spanish Antarctic base Juan Carlos I for four seasons, being the first Spanish woman to investigate the continent. The book has many anecdotes, notably the first few are mainly concerned with Antoni Ballester, the pioneer of Spanish presence in Antarctica in the 60's trying to carry out research projects on the continent.
- 2005: El Paper que juguen els oceans en l'equilibri del planeta Terra : The work was published in Catalan and includes talks about the impact of climate change and how environmental conditions of the planet have changed through the years.

=== Articles ===
_ 1963: Pigmentos de la diatomea marina Skeletonema costatum (Grev.) en su dependencia de los factores ambientales y de la dinámica de las poblaciones

_ 1964: Un sencillo experimento para demostrar la influencia de la concentración de elementos nutritivos sobre la calidad de los pigmentos de las algas

_ 1981: Aspectos microbiológicos del estudio oceanográfico de la plataforma continental. I. Planteamiento general

_ 1990: La investigación en la Antártida

_ 1997: ¿Por qué la Antártida atrae a los investigadores científicos?

_ 1999: La Antártida

_ 2002: Españoles en la Antártida

_ 2007: De cómo España abrió su ruta a la investigación antártica

_ 2014: El musclo i el seu entorn ambiental

_ 2015: Fascinación por la Naturaleza

=== Filmography ===
On the 25th anniversary of the creation of the Spanish base, Josefina Castellví, at 77, returned to Antarctica after more than a decade along with journalists and documentary director Albert Solé, who directed The Ice Memories. In the film Castellví documents her farewell journey from the white continent. The documentary was made as a tribute for all the work done by her and the three other scientists who got Spain to build the first base to investigate this remote area of the planet. The film chronicles this return to Antarctica.

Albert Solé said: "The truth is that I come from a family of very powerful women, a true matriarchy. That is why, when I met Josefina Castellví - It sounds like almost everyone - I immediately recognized a familiar landscape, with strong women and great fighters, who knew how to cope with many passions against many obstacles that life mounted against them in a very difficult time and world. I realized that in this story there was an alchemy of irresistible elements for me: woman, science, adventure and Antarctica."

Synopsis: In 1986, four Catalan scientists Agustí Julià, Joan Rovira, Josefina Castellví and Antoni Ballester managed to reach Antarctica with the project of planting their tent on Deception Island to force the Spanish state to join the Antarctic Treaty, which would eventually happen in 1988, and lay a foundation. The leader of the expedition, Dr. Antoni Ballester, would end up suffering a stroke that led Josefina Castellví to take over and run the small facility at a time when resources were quite limited for the Antarctic program. That was how she became the first female head of a foundation in the history of international Antarctic research. After retiring, she devoted her time to lace bobbin and gardening, her two passions then, but the photos hanging on the wall of her house and her collection of miniature penguins ensure the memory of her greatest adventure. In addition, she found the suitcase with 30 hours’ worth of film she had captured herself during her first years on the white continent. Because of this and the pressure of nostalgia, Josefina decided to return to Antarctica.

The documentary was first broadcast on the second channel of Televisión Española on Friday 30 May 2014.

== Recognition ==
- Proèmula Prize for the female director of the year (1994).
- Medalla d'Or for Scientific Merit awarded by the City of Barcelona (1995).
- Narcís Monturiol Medal for the Scientific and Technological Merit awarded by the Government of Catalonia (1996).
- Lady of Goya Award awarded by the Spanish Friends of Goya Association (1997).
- Imhotep-Creu Blanca Foundation Prize (1998).
- The Spanish Geographic Society's National Prize (1998).
- The Spanish Order of Civil Merit (2002).
- Creu de Sant Jordi Award by the Government of Catalonia (2003).
- Nationale Swisse Environmental Award (2003).
- Esteva Bassols Prize: "Senyora of Barcelona" (2005).
- Catalan of the year Award awarded and voted by the readers of El Peródico de Cataluña (2013).
- August Pi i Sunyer Medal awarded by the University of Barcelona (2015).
