= Castro Peak =

Peak on Livingston Island, Antarctica

Coordinates: 62°42′19″S 60°23′54″W

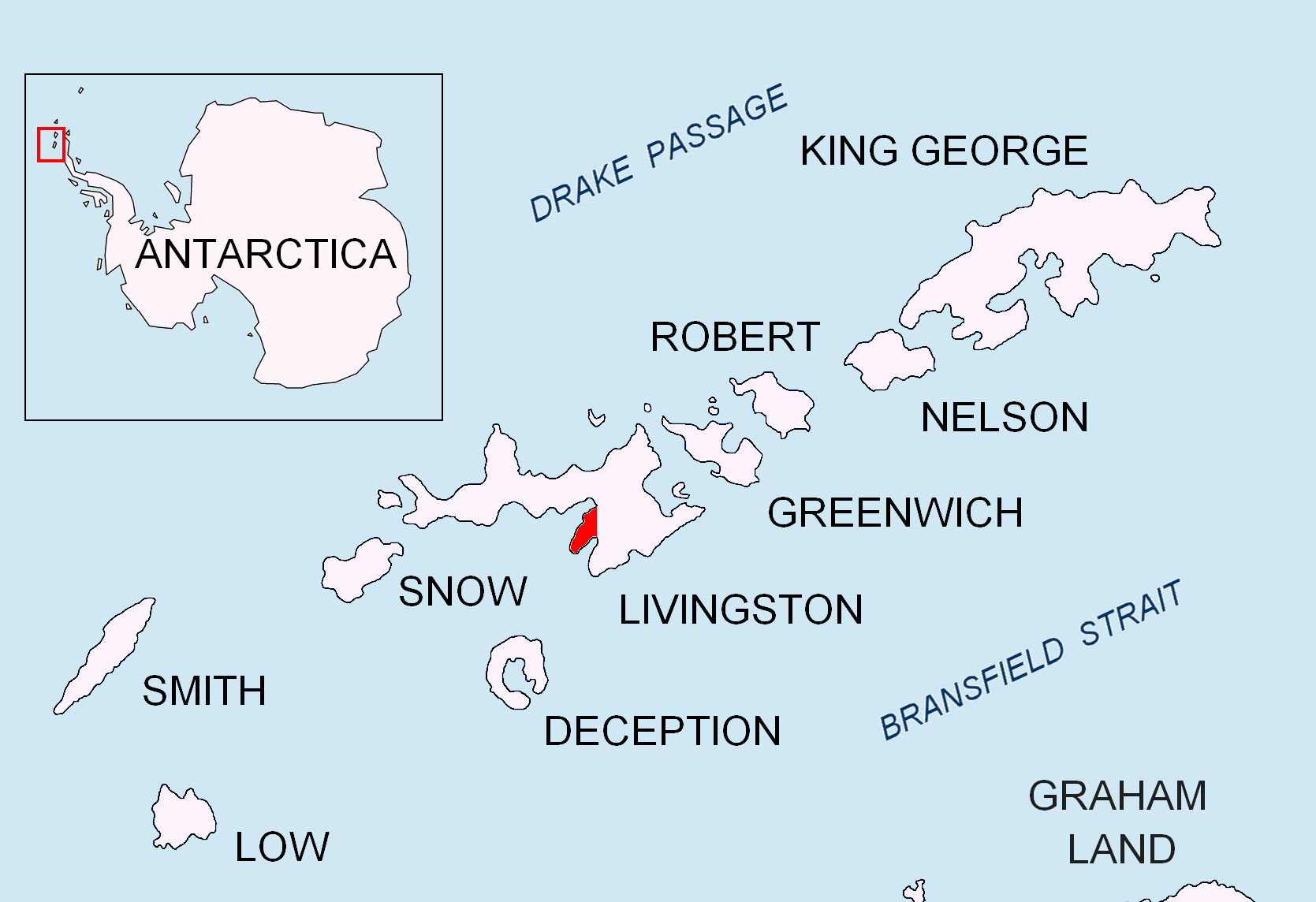
Location of Hurd Peninsula on Livingston Island in the South Shetland Islands.

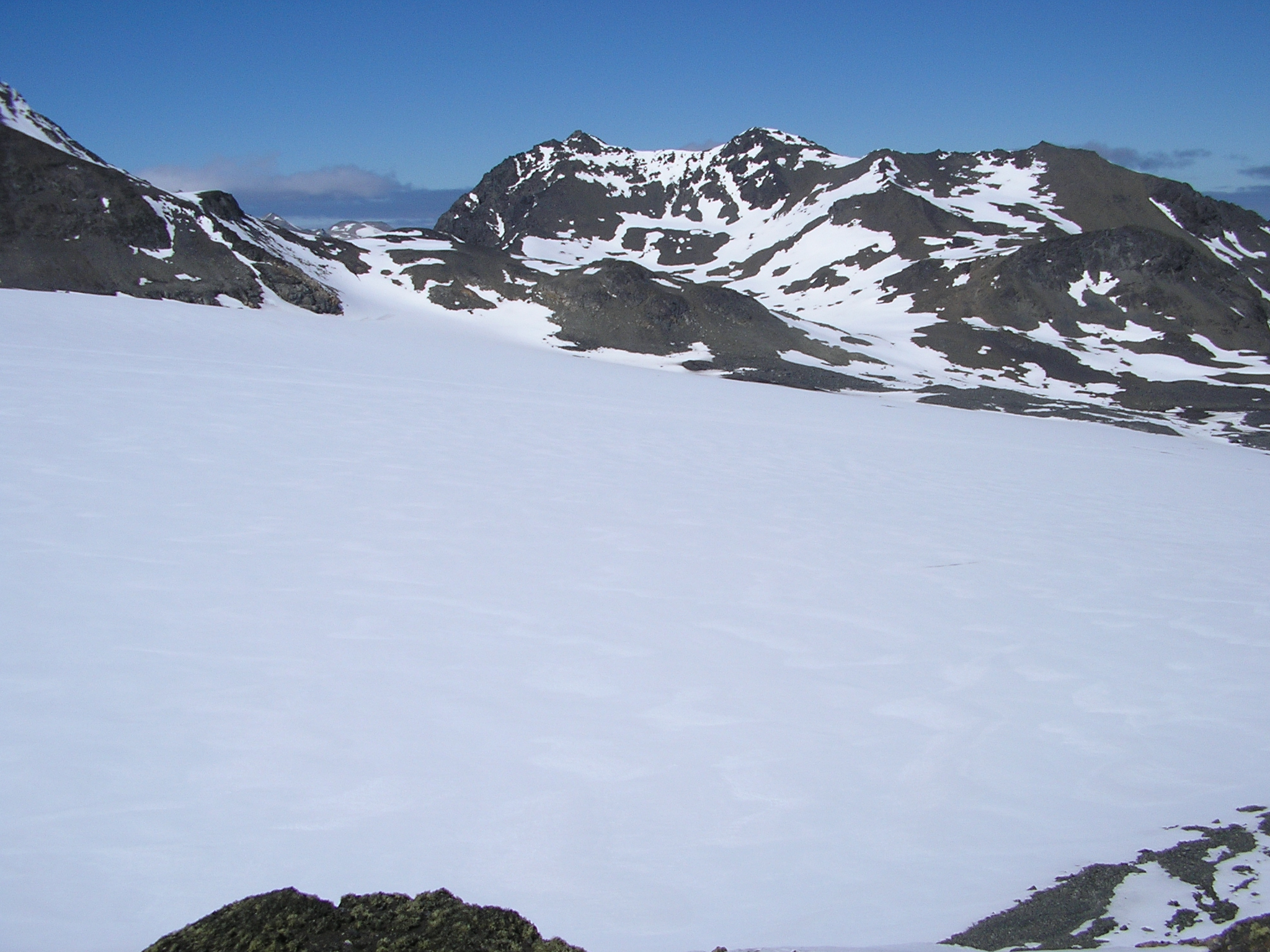
Castro Peak

Topographic map of Livingston Island and Smith Island.

Castro Peak (Bulgarian: връх Кастро, romanized: vrah Kastro, IPA: [ˈvrɤx ˈkastro]) is a peak rising to 306 m on Hurd Peninsula, Livingston Island, Antarctica. Situated 750 m south-southwest of MacGregor Peaks and 1.87 km northeast of Binn Peak. Spanish early mapping in 1991. Named for Vicente Castro, mountain guide at Juan Carlos I Antarctic Base who took part in the first ascent of the peak during the 2003/04 season.

== Maps ==
- Isla Livingston: Península Hurd. Mapa topográfico de escala 1:25000. Madrid: Servicio Geográfico del Ejército, 1991. (Map reproduced on p. 16 of the linked work)
- L.L. Ivanov et al. Antarctica: Livingston Island and Greenwich Island, South Shetland Islands. Scale 1:100000 topographic map. Sofia: Antarctic Place-names Commission of Bulgaria, 2005.
- L.L. Ivanov. Antarctica: Livingston Island and Greenwich, Robert, Snow and Smith Islands. Scale 1:120000 topographic map. Troyan: Manfred Wörner Foundation, 2009. ISBN 978-954-92032-6-4
- Antarctic Digital Database (ADD). Scale 1:250000 topographic map of Antarctica. Scientific Committee on Antarctic Research (SCAR). Since 1993, regularly upgraded and updated.
- L.L. Ivanov. Antarctica: Livingston Island and Smith Island. Scale 1:100000 topographic map. Manfred Wörner Foundation, 2017. ISBN 978-619-90008-3-0
