= Ogosta Point =

Point in the South Shetland Islands, Antarctica

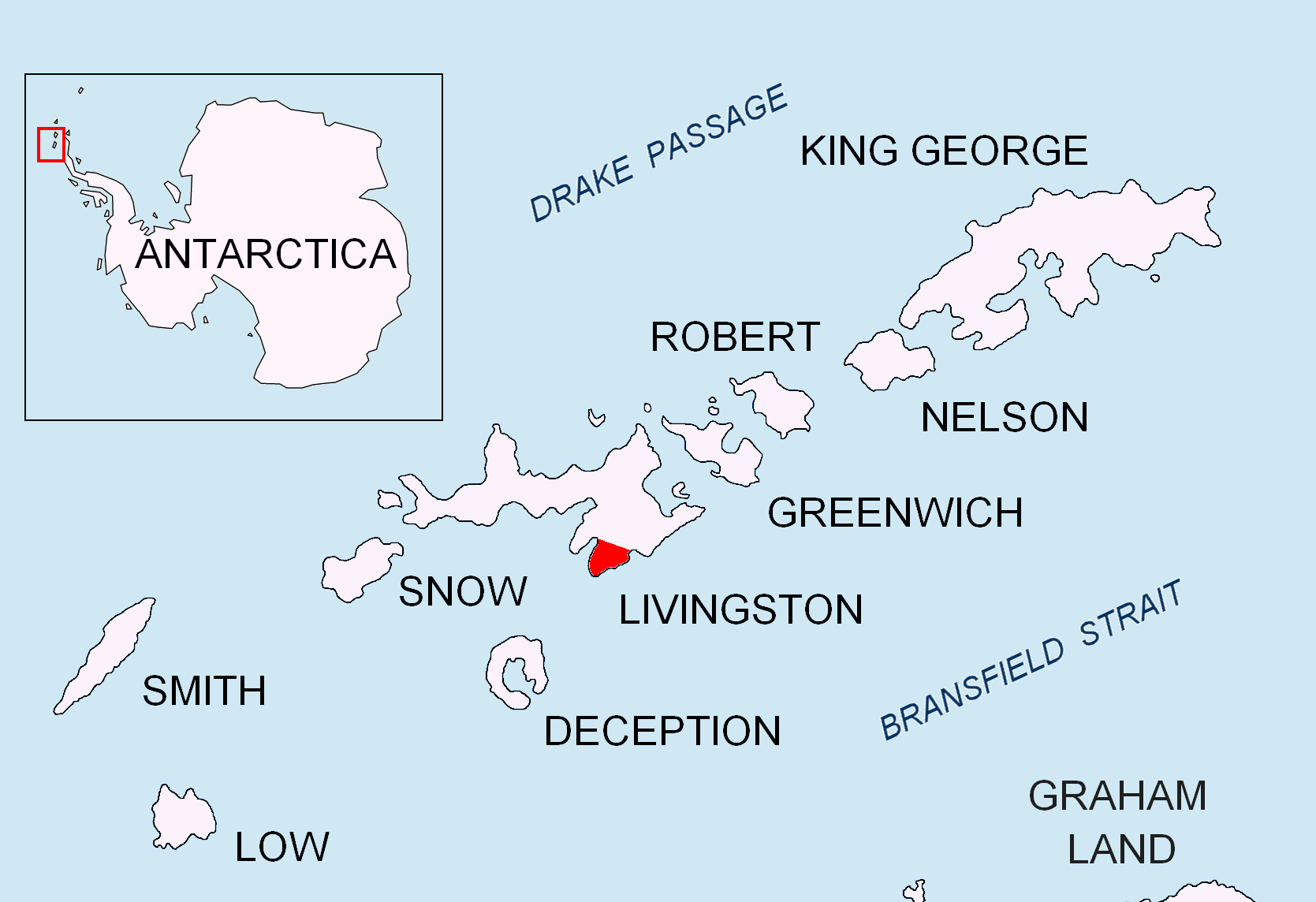
Location of Rozhen Peninsula on Livingston Island in the South Shetland Islands.

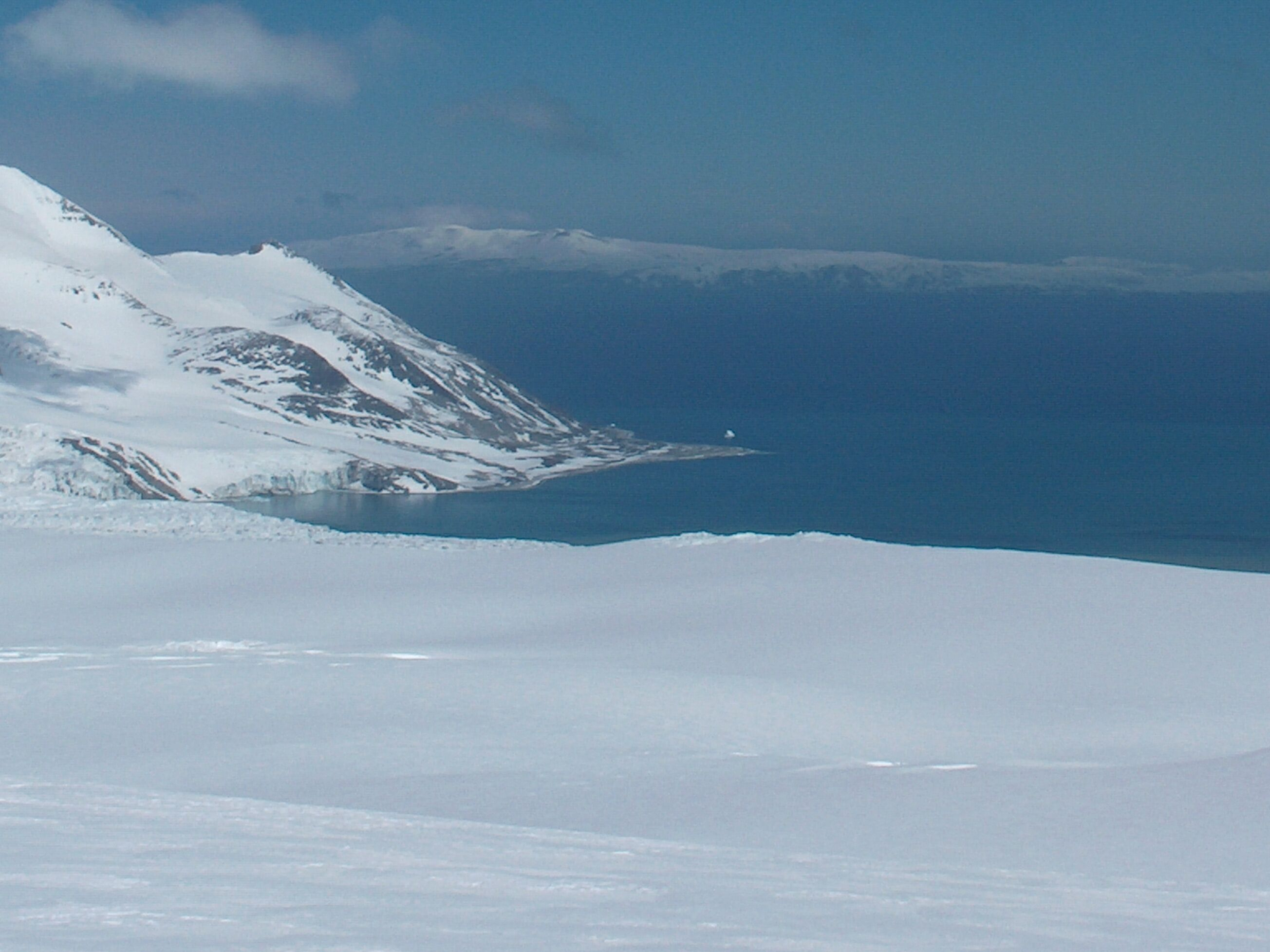
Ogosta Point from Willan Saddle, with Huntress Glacier in the foreground and Deception Island in the background.

Topographic map of Livingston Island

Ogosta Point (Nos Ogosta \'nos o-'gos-ta\) is located in the central part of Zagore Beach on the east coast of False Bay, Livingston Island in the South Shetland Islands, Antarctica. Situated on Rozhen Peninsula 5.35 km north of Barnard Point, 4.4 km west of St. Methodius Peak and 3.45 km east of Castro Peak. The point is named after the Ogosta River in Bulgaria.

== Location ==
The point is located at 62°42′37″S 60°19′54″W.

== Maps ==
- South Shetland Islands. Scale 1:200000 topographic map. DOS 610 Sheet W 62 60. Tolworth, UK, 1968.
- Islas Livingston y Decepción. Mapa topográfico a escala 1:100000. Madrid: Servicio Geográfico del Ejército, 1991.
- S. Soccol, D. Gildea and J. Bath. Livingston Island, Antarctica. Scale 1:100000 satellite map. The Omega Foundation, USA, 2004.
- L.L. Ivanov et al., Antarctica: Livingston Island and Greenwich Island, South Shetland Islands (from English Strait to Morton Strait, with illustrations and ice-cover distribution), 1:100000 scale topographic map, Antarctic Place-names Commission of Bulgaria, Sofia, 2005
- L.L. Ivanov. Antarctica: Livingston Island and Greenwich, Robert, Snow and Smith Islands. Scale 1:120000 topographic map. Troyan: Manfred Wörner Foundation, 2010. ISBN 978-954-92032-9-5 (First edition 2009. ISBN 978-954-92032-6-4)
- Antarctic Digital Database (ADD). Scale 1:250000 topographic map of Antarctica. Scientific Committee on Antarctic Research (SCAR). Since 1993, regularly upgraded and updated.
- L.L. Ivanov. Antarctica: Livingston Island and Smith Island. Scale 1:100000 topographic map. Manfred Wörner Foundation, 2017. ISBN 978-619-90008-3-0
