= Castellvi Peak =

Mountain in Livingston Island, South Shetland Islands, Antarctica

Coordinates: 62°41′34″S 60°23′10″W

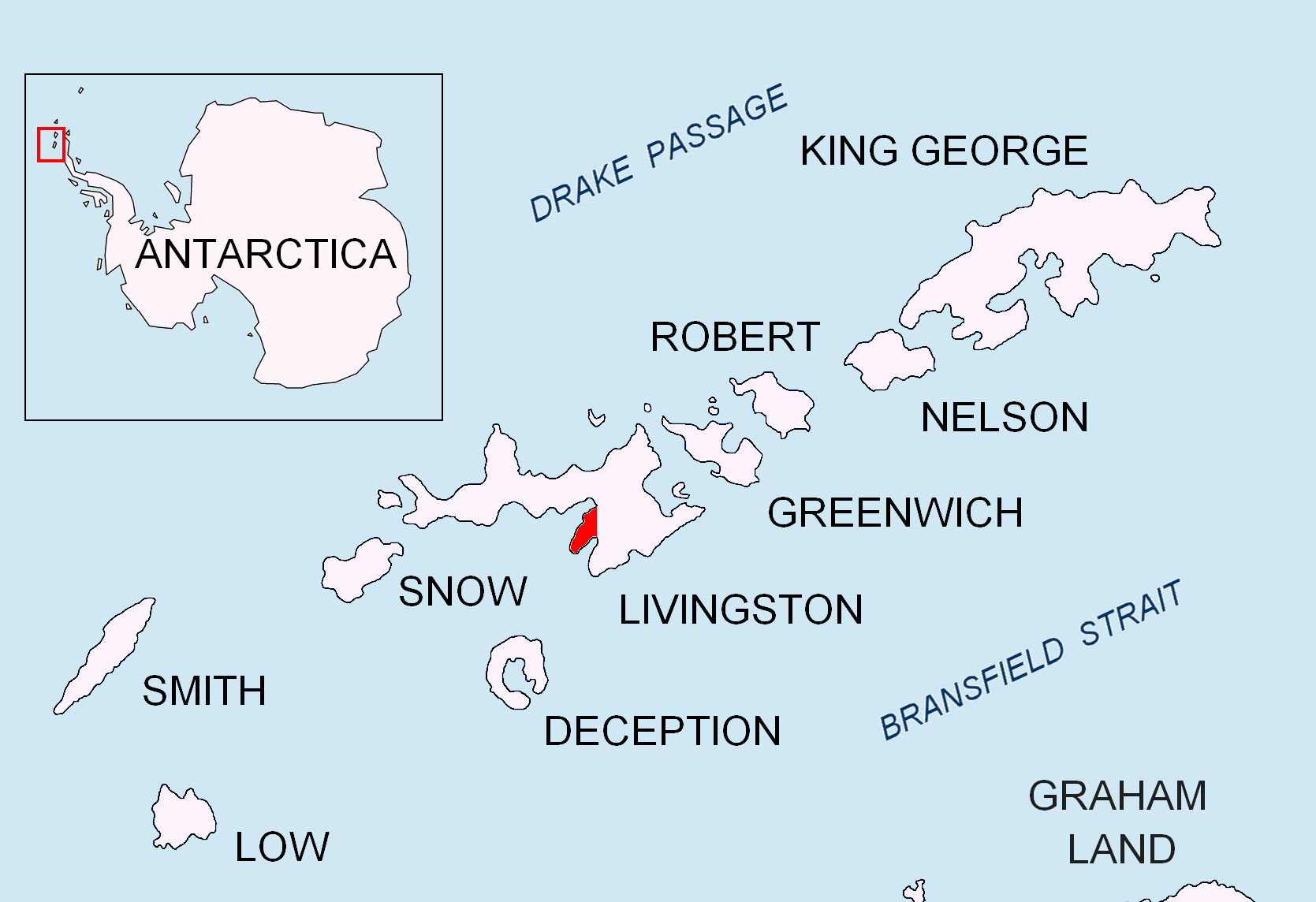
Location of Hurd Peninsula on Livingston Island in the South Shetland Islands.

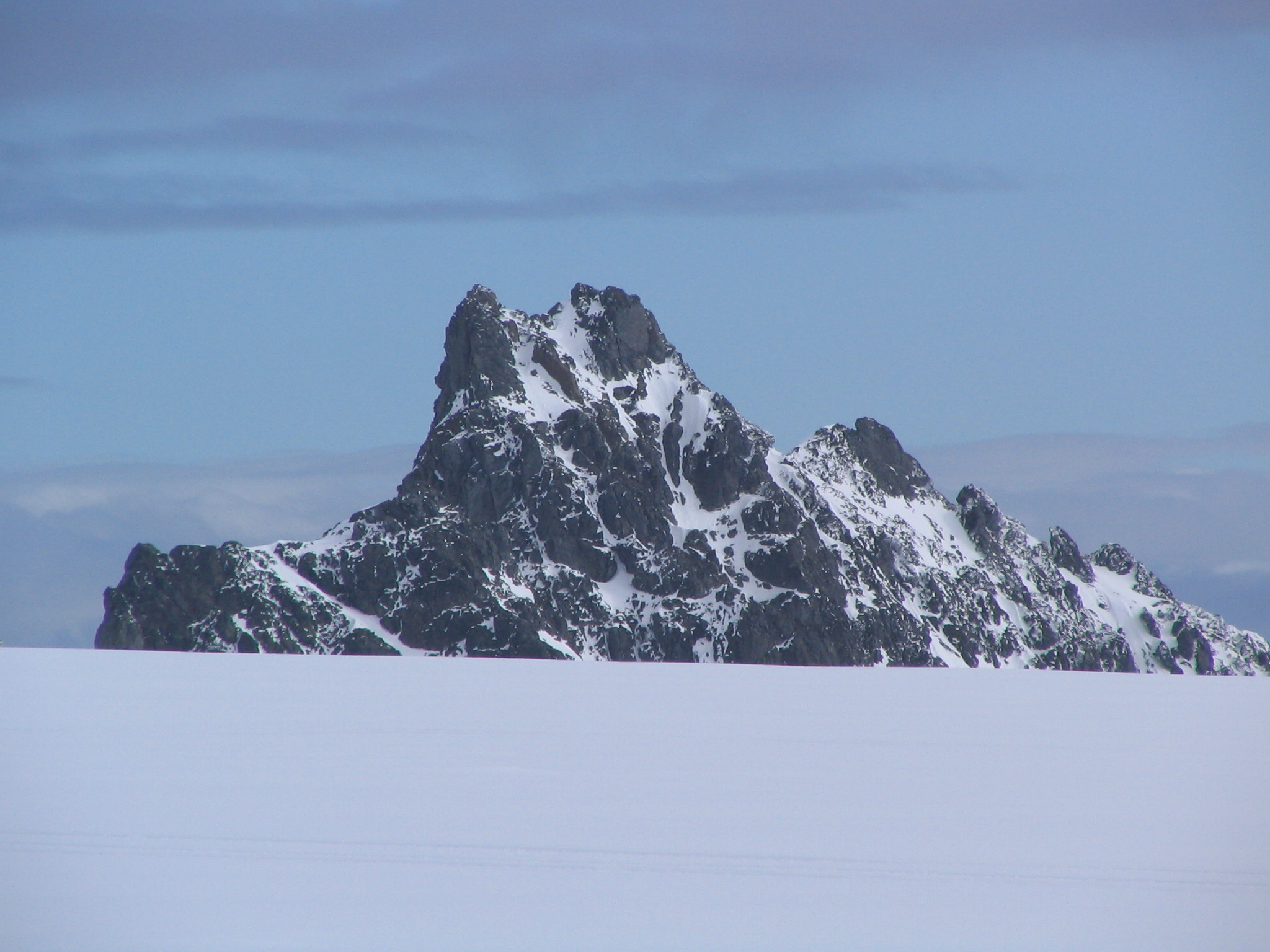
Castellvi Peak from Hurd Ice Cap.

Topographic map of Livingston Island and Smith Island.

Castellvi Peak (Bulgarian: връх Кастелви, romanized: vrah Kastelvi, IPA: [ˈvrɤx kɐˈstɛɫvi]) is a peak rising to 350 m on Hurd Peninsula, Livingston Island. Situated 800 m northeast of MacGregor Peaks and 1.4 km southwest of Dorotea Peak. Spanish early mapping in 1991. Named for Josefina Castellví i Piulachs, a doyen of the Spanish Antarctic Program.

== Maps ==
- Isla Livingston: Península Hurd. Mapa topográfico de escala 1:25000. Madrid: Servicio Geográfico del Ejército, 1991. (Map reproduced on p. 16 of the linked work)
- L.L. Ivanov et al. Antarctica: Livingston Island and Greenwich Island, South Shetland Islands. Scale 1:100000 topographic map. Sofia: Antarctic Place-names Commission of Bulgaria, 2005.
- L.L. Ivanov. Antarctica: Livingston Island and Greenwich, Robert, Snow and Smith Islands. Scale 1:120000 topographic map. Troyan: Manfred Wörner Foundation, 2009. ISBN 978-954-92032-6-4
- Antarctic Digital Database (ADD). Scale 1:250000 topographic map of Antarctica. Scientific Committee on Antarctic Research (SCAR). Since 1993, regularly upgraded and updated.
- L.L. Ivanov. Antarctica: Livingston Island and Smith Island. Scale 1:100000 topographic map. Manfred Wörner Foundation, 2017. ISBN 978-619-90008-3-0
