= Binn Peak =

Mountain in Livingston Island, South Shetland Islands, Antarctica

Location of Livingston Island in the South Shetland Islands.

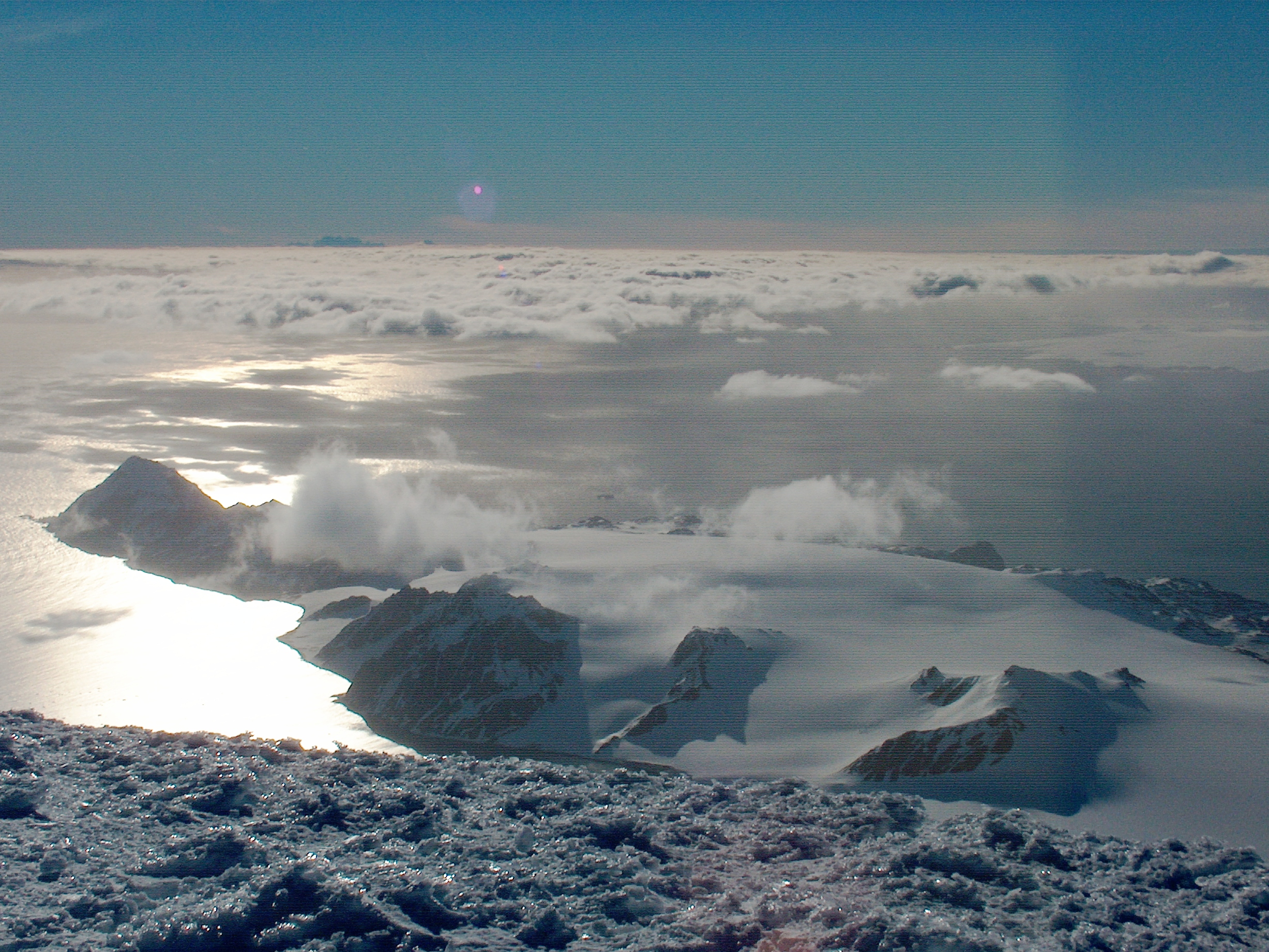
Binn Peak (on the left) from Mount Friesland.

Topographic map of Livingston Island and Smith Island.

Binn Peak is the conspicuous rocky peak rising to 400 m above Miers Bluff at the southwest extremity of Hurd Peninsula, Livingston Island in the South Shetland Islands, Antarctica.

The feature is named after Captain T. Binn, Master of the British sealing vessel Minerva that visited the South Shetlands in 1820–21.

== Location ==
The peak is located at 62°43′02″S 60°25′29.3″W which is 2.66 km south-southwest of MacGregor Peaks, 5.2 km southwest of Moores Peak and 5.43 km west by north of Canetti Peak (British mapping in 1968, Spanish in 1991, and Bulgarian in 2005 and 2009).

== Maps ==
- Isla Livingston: Península Hurd. Mapa topográfico de escala 1:25000. Madrid: Servicio Geográfico del Ejército, 1991. (Map reproduced on p. 16 of the linked work)
- L.L. Ivanov et al. Antarctica: Livingston Island and Greenwich Island, South Shetland Islands. Scale 1:100000 topographic map. Sofia: Antarctic Place-names Commission of Bulgaria, 2005.
- L.L. Ivanov. Antarctica: Livingston Island and Greenwich, Robert, Snow and Smith Islands. Scale 1:120000 topographic map. Troyan: Manfred Wörner Foundation, 2009. ISBN 978-954-92032-6-4
- Antarctic Digital Database (ADD). Scale 1:250000 topographic map of Antarctica. Scientific Committee on Antarctic Research (SCAR). Since 1993, regularly upgraded and updated.
- L.L. Ivanov. Antarctica: Livingston Island and Smith Island. Scale 1:100000 topographic map. Manfred Wörner Foundation, 2017. ISBN 978-619-90008-3-0
