= False Bay (Livingston Island) =

Bay between Barnard Point and Miers Bluff on the south side of Livingston Island

Location of Livingston Island in the South Shetland Islands

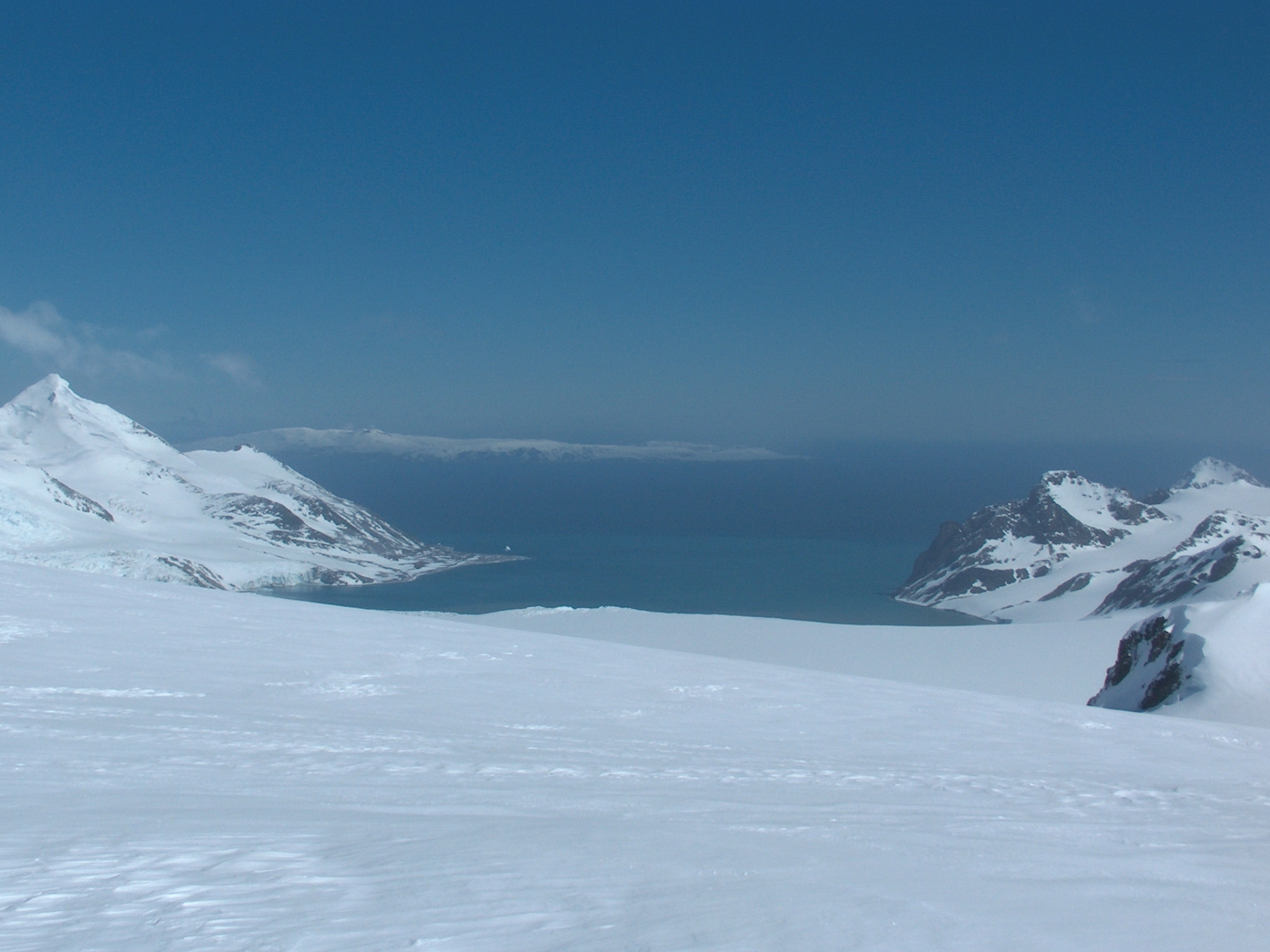
False Bay from Orpheus Gate, with Deception Island in the background

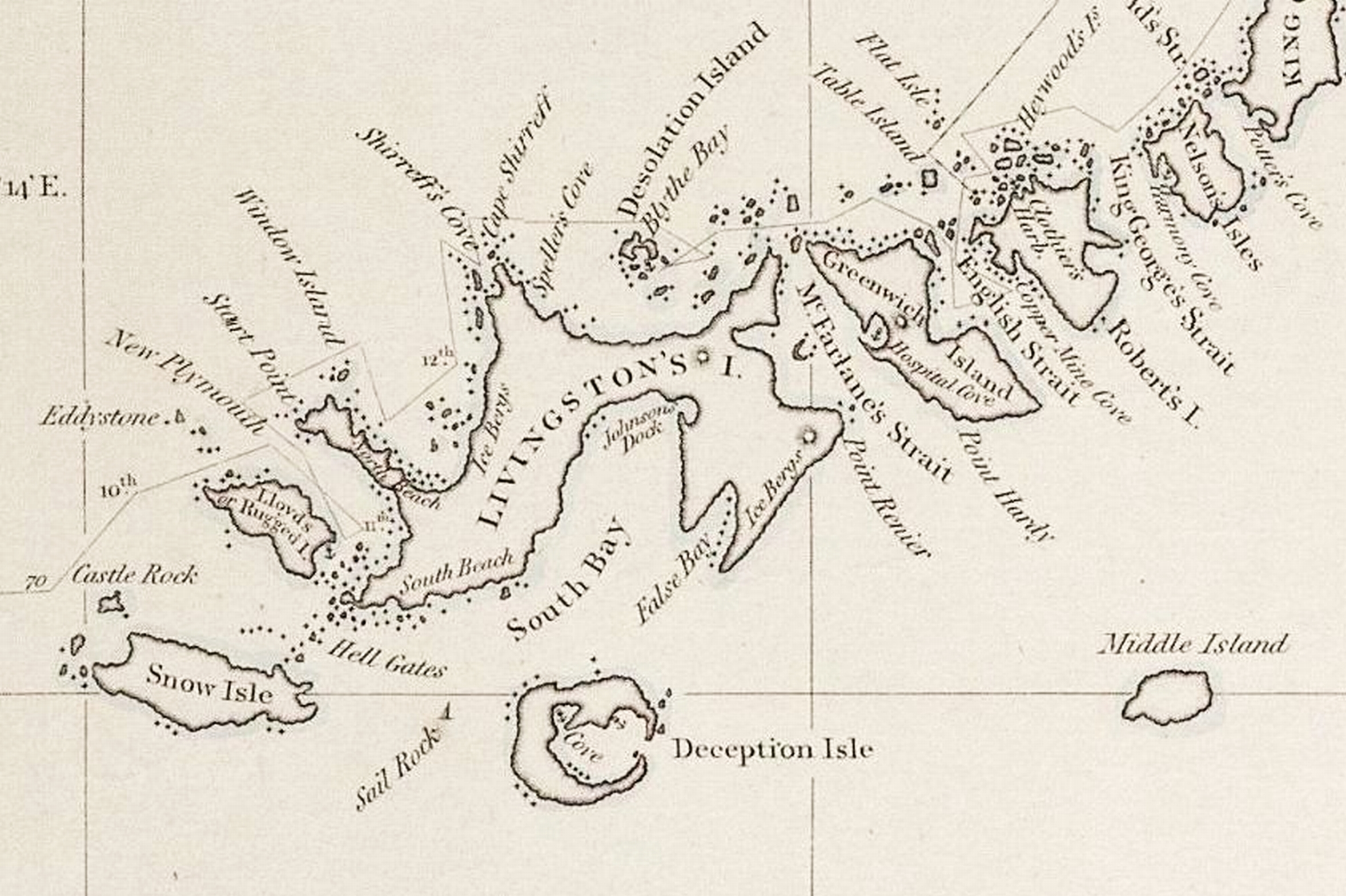
Fragment of George Powell's 1822 chart of the South Shetland Islands and South Orkney Islands featuring South Bay

Topographic map of Livingston Island

False Bay (62°43′S 60°22′W) is a bay 4 miles (6.4 km) long, which lies between Barnard Point and Miers Bluff on the south side of Livingston Island, in the South Shetland Islands, Antarctica. The glaciers Hurd Ice Cap, Huntress, Ruen Icefall, Peshtera and Charity feed the bay.

It was probably first entered and charted by Captain Nathaniel Palmer in November 1820, and was likely named because of the possibility in thick weather of confusion between this feature and nearby South Bay, where Johnsons Dock was frequented by the early sealers.

== Maps ==
- Chart of South Shetland including Coronation Island, &c. from the exploration of the sloop Dove in the years 1821 and 1822 by George Powell Commander of the same. Scale ca. 1:200000. London: Laurie, 1822
- South Shetland Islands. Scale 1:200000 topographic map No. 5657. DOS 610 – W 62 60. Tolworth, UK, 1968.
- Islas Livingston y Decepción. Mapa topográfico a escala 1:100000. Madrid: Servicio Geográfico del Ejército, 1991.
- L.L. Ivanov. Antarctica: Livingston Island and Greenwich, Robert, Snow and Smith Islands. Scale 1:120000 topographic map. Troyan: Manfred Wörner Foundation, 2009.
- Antarctic Digital Database (ADD). Scale 1:250000 topographic map of Antarctica. Scientific Committee on Antarctic Research (SCAR). Since 1993, regularly upgraded and updated.
- L.L. Ivanov. Antarctica: Livingston Island and Smith Island. Scale 1:100000 topographic map. Manfred Wörner Foundation, 2017. ISBN 978-619-90008-3-0

== See also ==
- Buena Nueva Cove
