= MacGregor Peaks =

Mountain in Livingston Island, South Shetland Islands, Antarctica

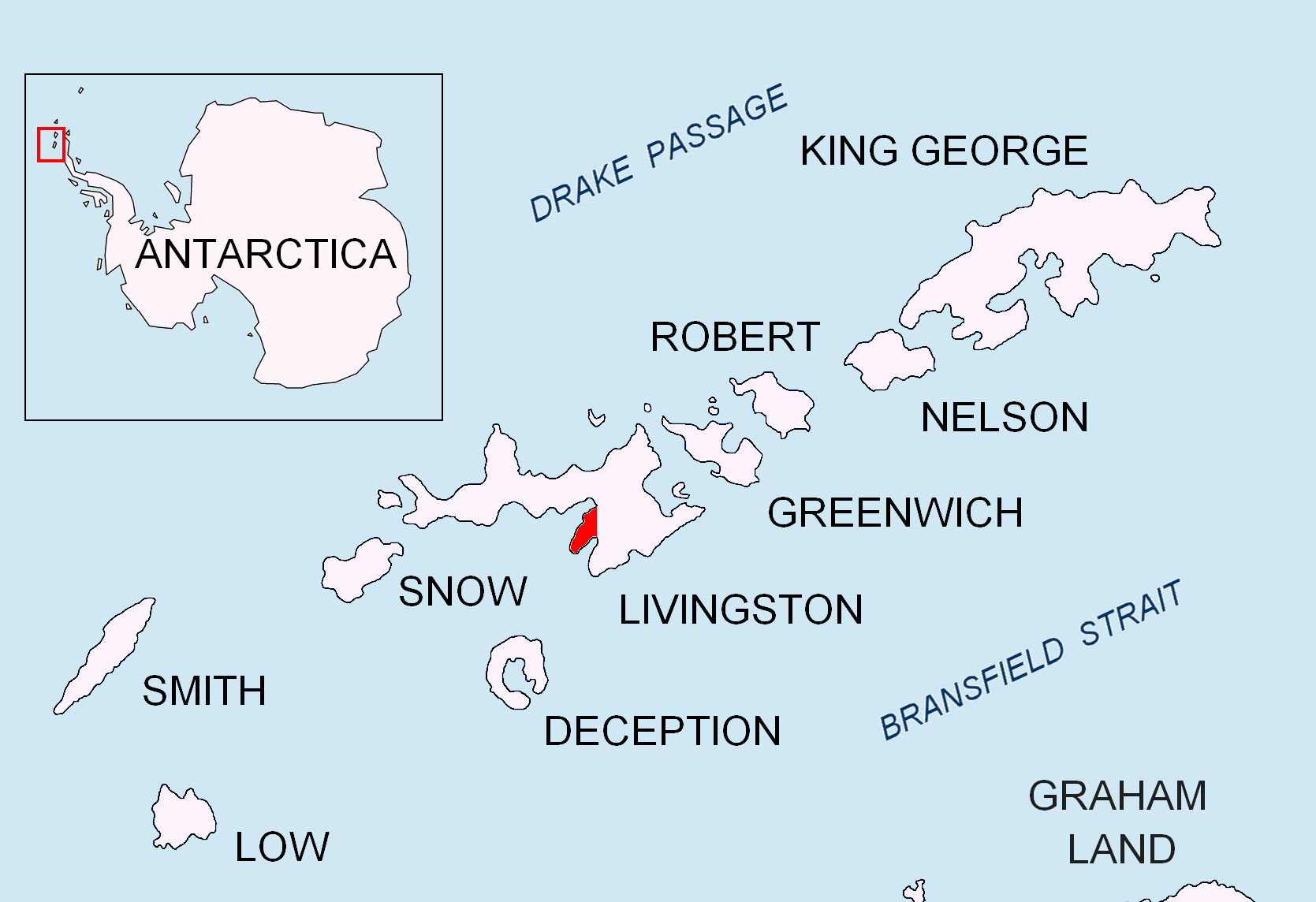
Location of Hurd Peninsula on Livingston Island in the South Shetland Islands.

Topographic map of Livingston Island.

MacGregor Peaks are rocky peaks rising to 350 m in the south part of Hurd Peninsula, Livingston Island in the South Shetland Islands, Antarctica.

The peaks are named after Captain Christopher MacGregor, Master of the British sealing vessel Minstrel that visited the South Shetlands in 1820–21.

== Location ==
The peaks are centred at 62°41′50″S 60°23′46″W which is 710 m southwest of Castellvi Peak, 2.83 km west-southwest of Moores Peak and 4.9 km northwest of Canetti Peak (British mapping in 1968, Spanish in 1991, and Bulgarian in 2005 and 2009).

== Maps ==
- Isla Livingston: Península Hurd. Mapa topográfico de escala 1:25000. Madrid: Servicio Geográfico del Ejército, 1991. (Map reproduced on p. 16 of the linked work)
- L.L. Ivanov et al. Antarctica: Livingston Island and Greenwich Island, South Shetland Islands. Scale 1:100000 topographic map. Sofia: Antarctic Place-names Commission of Bulgaria, 2005.
- L.L. Ivanov. Antarctica: Livingston Island and Greenwich, Robert, Snow and Smith Islands. Scale 1:120000 topographic map. Troyan: Manfred Wörner Foundation, 2009. ISBN 978-954-92032-6-4
- Antarctic Digital Database (ADD). Scale 1:250000 topographic map of Antarctica. Scientific Committee on Antarctic Research (SCAR). Since 1993, regularly upgraded and updated.
- L.L. Ivanov. Antarctica: Livingston Island and Smith Island. Scale 1:100000 topographic map. Manfred Wörner Foundation, 2017. ISBN 978-619-90008-3-0
