= Ivanov Beach =

Mostly ice-free beach in the South Shetland Islands, Antarctica

Location of Livingston Island in the South Shetland Islands and Antarctica

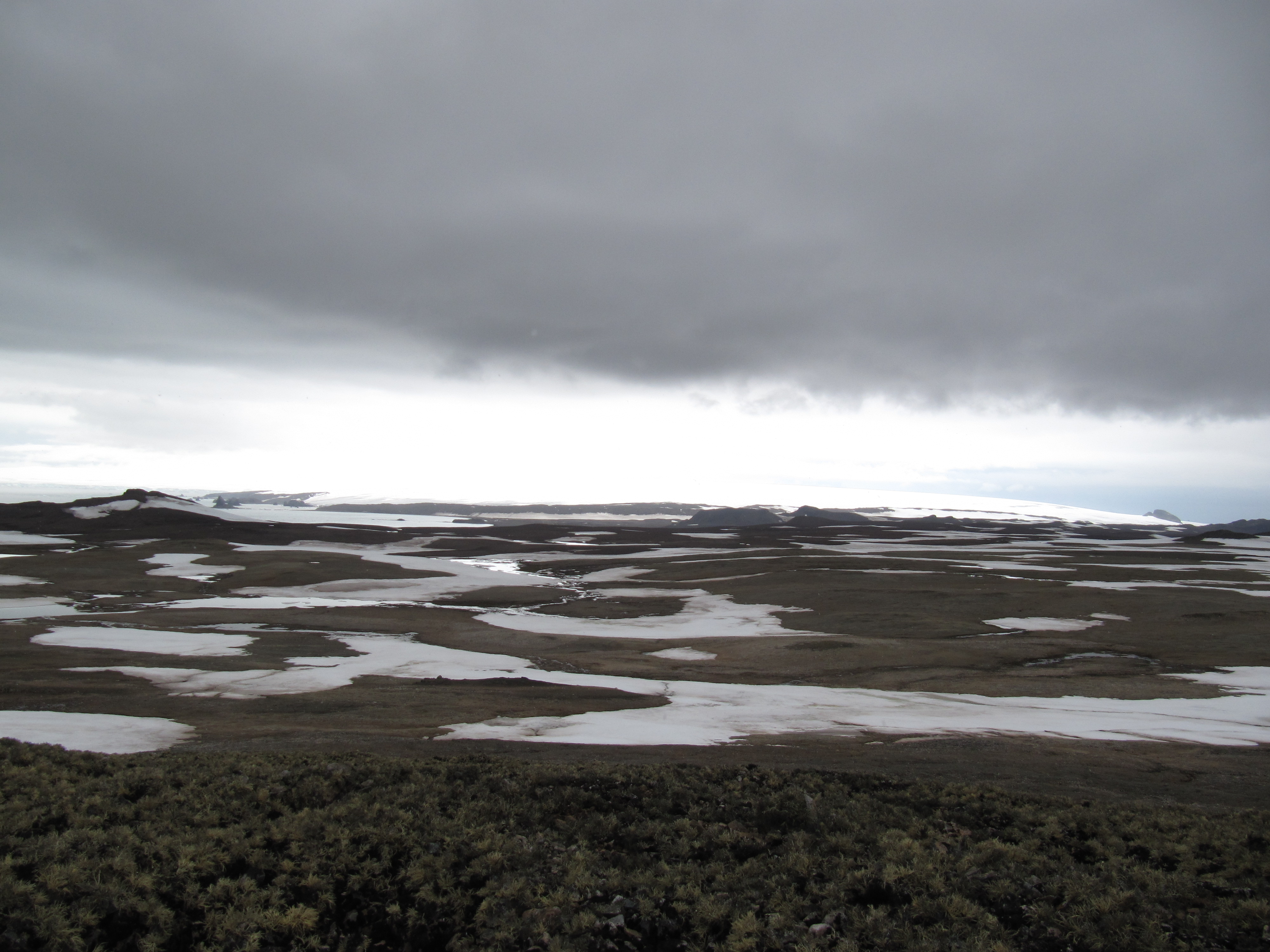
Eastern Byers Peninsula in Livingston Island with left to right Lair Hill, Robbery Beaches, Sparadok Point, Tsamblak Hill and Negro Hill in the middle ground; and Rowe Point, Cutler Stack, Ivanov Beach, Nedelya Point, Urvich Wall surmounted by the slopes of Rotch Dome, and Clark Nunatak in the background

Ivanov Beach (Bulgarian: Иванов бряг, romanized: Ivanov bryag, IPA: [ivɐˈnɔv ˈbrʲak]) is a mostly ice-free beach on the Drake Passage stretching 5 km (3.1 mi) in southwest–northeast direction on the southeast coast of Barclay Bay in western Livingston Island, South Shetland Islands in Antarctica. It extends to Nedelya Point and Byers Peninsula on the southwest, Rowe Point and Etar Snowfield on the northeast, and the slopes of Rotch Dome on the southeast. Its ice-free area is ca. 144 hectares (360 acres).

The beach features Bilyar Point 1.7 km (1.1 mi) northeast of Nedelya Point, Mneme Lake just west of Rowe Point and a minor point 1.1 km (0.68 mi) southwest of the latter. The beach is protected by shallows, and numerous offshore rocks and islets with the largest of them being Cutler Stack off Nedelya Point.

The feature is named for Lyubomir Ivanov, topographic surveyor in Antarctica during the 1994/95 and subsequent seasons, author of Antarctic topographic maps, and founding chairman of the Antarctic Place-names Commission of Bulgaria. In particular, he led the Tangra 2004/05 Survey noted by Discovery Channel, the Natural History Museum, the Royal Collection and the British Antarctic Survey as a timeline event in Antarctic exploration.

== Location ==
Ivanov Beach is centred at 62°36′22″S 60°56′14″W. British mapping was carried out in 1822 and 1968, Chilean in 1971, Argentine in 1980, Spanish in 1991 and 1992, and Bulgarian in 2005, 2009 and 2017.

== History ==
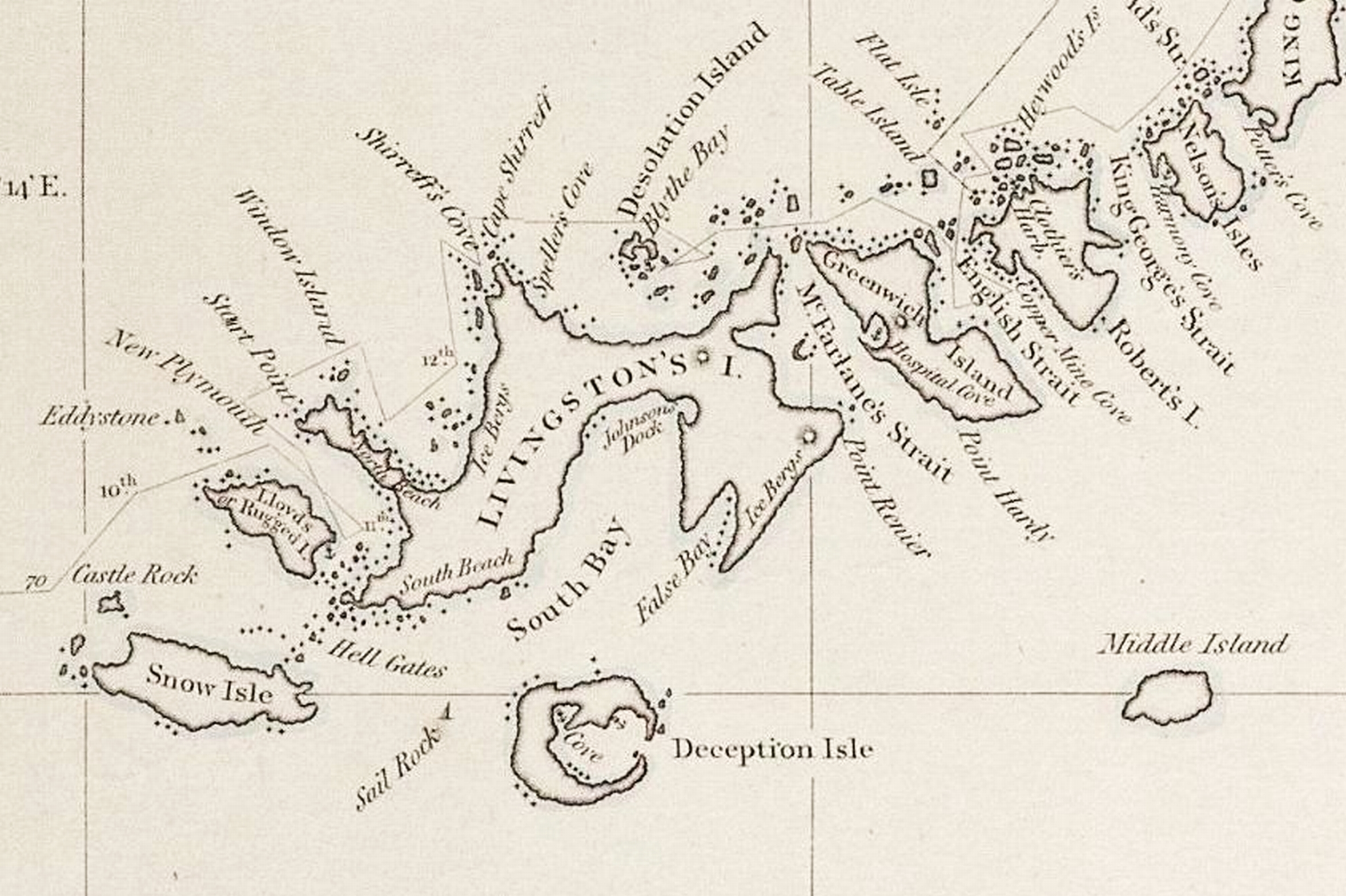
Fragment of George Powell's 1822 chart of the South Shetland Islands and South Orkney Islands; the depicted track of his sloop Dove indicates he sailed past Ivanov Beach (the strip along the left-side inscription 'Ice Bergs') on 11 November 1821

Following the discovery of Livingston Island by William Smith in 1819, the vicinity was visited by British and American sealers frequenting Cape Shirreff on Ioannes Paulus II Peninsula and nearby Robbery Beaches, South Beaches, and President Beaches on Byers Peninsula. As the seals were killed onshore, the hunters spent protracted periods of time there, seeking refuge from the elements in purpose-built stone huts, tent bivouacs, or natural caves. Livingston Island became the most populous place in Antarctica for a time, its inhabitants exceeding 200 in number during the 1820–23 South Shetlands sealing rush. The principal sealer ‘settlements’ on the island were situated on Byers Peninsula near Nikopol Point, Sealer Hill, Negro Hill, Rish Point, Sparadok Point, Lair Point and Varadero Point, as well as at Cape Shirreff and Elephant Point.

Remnants of huts, boats and other sealer equipment and belongings are still present at a number of Byers Peninsula sites, which have become the subject of systematic archaeological research. Some 26 human shelter structures have been identified there, the nearest ones to Ivanov Beach situated east of Sparadok Point. However, the beach itself is believed to have been visited only very rarely (one such visit was to Nedelya Point by a field party from the British base camp Station P during the season 1957/58), and deemed free of non-native plants. In order to protect its pristine environment, the beach has been placed under a particularly strict biosecurity regime.

== Protection status ==
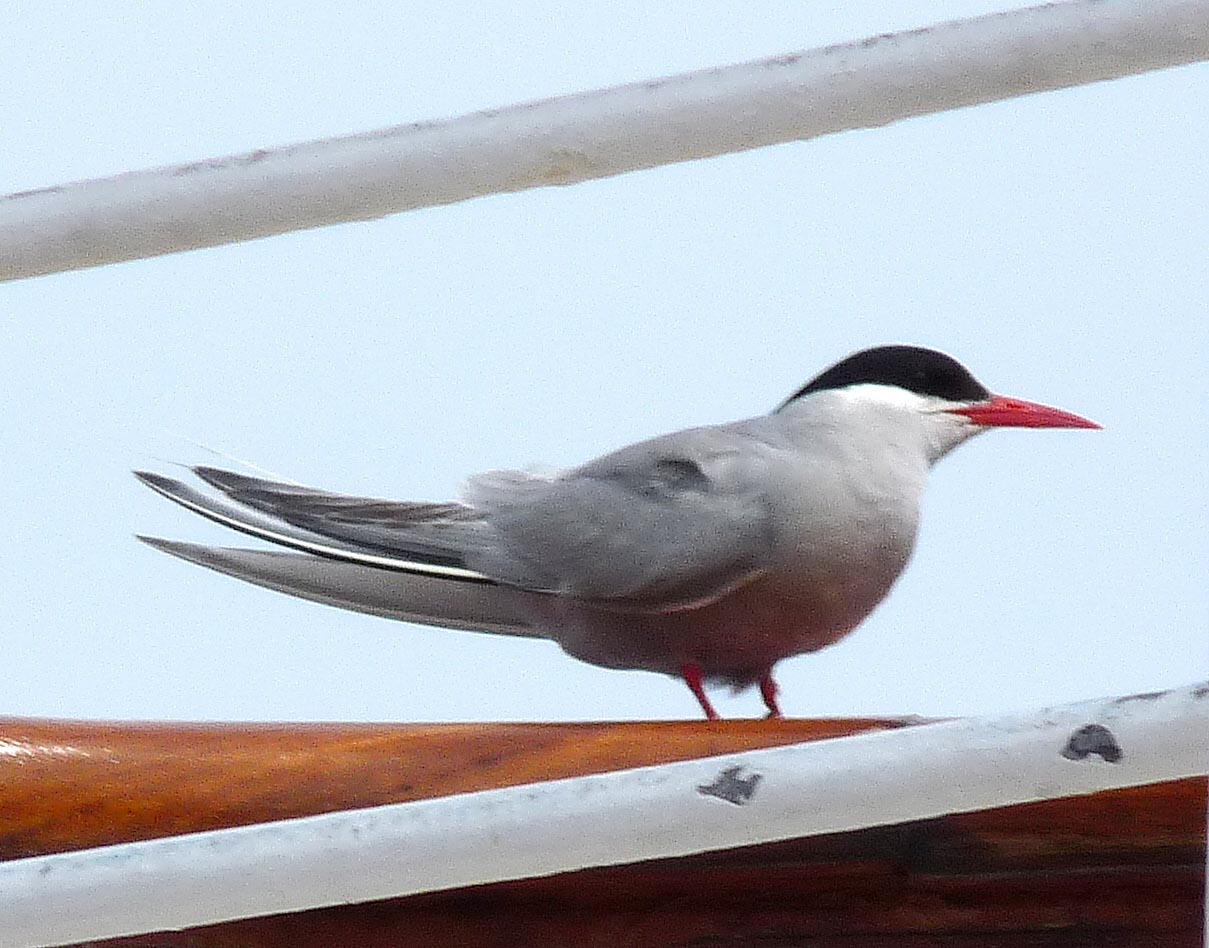
Antarctic Tern, one of the species for which the Important Bird Area Byers Peninsula merits protection

Except for its offshore islets and rocks, in 2016 Ivanov Beach was incorporated in an enlarged Antarctic Specially Protected Area ASPA 126 Byers Peninsula, and further designated within it as a restricted zone of scientific importance to Antarctic microbiology, with greater restriction placed on access with the aim of preventing microbial or other contamination by human activity.

Inland from the beach, the restricted zone includes also the northern part of the ridge Urvich Wall, and the adjacent glaciated area on the west and northwest slopes of Rotch Dome bounded on the east by longitude 60°53′45″W, on the south by latitude 62°38′30″S and on the west by longitude 60°58′48″W.

Certain vectors of alien species transmission remain unchecked though, including the wood and plastic marine debris, more abundant on northerly Livingston beaches due to their exposure to Drake Passage.

== Important Bird Area ==
The beach is part of the Important Bird Area (IBA) Byers Peninsula, Livingston Island identified by BirdLife International, which coincides territorially with the protected area ASPA 126 Byers Peninsula.

Map of Byers Peninsula featuring Antarctic Specially Protected Area ASPA 126 and its two restricted zones including Ivanov Beach

Topographic map of Livingston Island and Smith Island

== In fiction ==
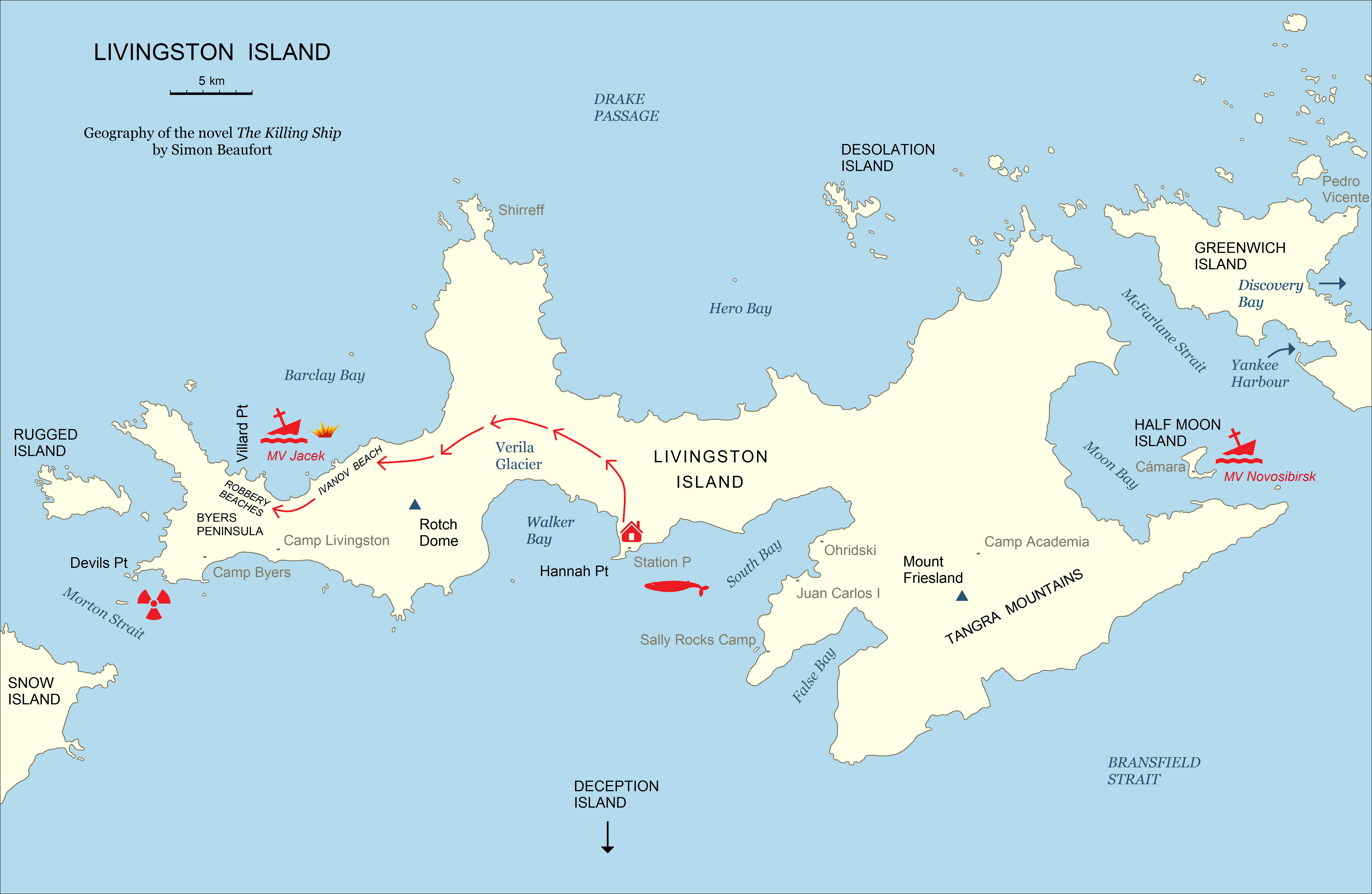
Geography of the thriller novel The Killing Ship by Simon Beaufort

Ivanov Beach is part of the mise-en-scène in the Antarctica thriller novel The Killing Ship authored by Elizabeth Cruwys and Beau Riffenburgh under their joint alias Simon Beaufort in 2016. A landmark locality in the course of a modern-day plot with action spreading westwards from Hannah Point, skirting Verila Glacier and Rotch Dome in the process, and eventually reaching Robbery Beaches and Villard Point on Byers Peninsula, the beach is shown on a sketch map of Livingston Island illustrating the book.
