= Bilyar Point =

Point in the South Shetland Islands, Antarctica

Location of Livingston Island in the South Shetland Islands.

Topographic map of Byers Peninsula featuring Antarctic Specially Protected Area ASPA 126 and its two restricted zones

Topographic map of Livingston Island and Smith Island.

Bilyar Point (Bulgarian: нос Биляр, ‘Nos Bilyar’ \'nos bi-'lyar\) is a rounded ice-free point on Ivanov Beach in western Livingston Island, the South Shetland Islands in Antarctica projecting 350 m into Barclay Bay. Situated 3 km southwest of Rowe Point, northwest of Rotch Dome, 1.7 km northeast of Nedelya Point and 4.5 km east-northeast of Lair Point.

The feature is part of the Antarctic Specially Protected Area ASPA 126 Byers Peninsula, situated in one of its restricted zones.

The point is named after the medieval city of Bilyar, capital of Volga Bulgaria in 12-13th Century AD.

== Location ==
Bilyar Point is located at 62°36′12″S 60°56′58″W. British mapping in 1968, Chilean in 1971, Argentine in 1980, Spanish in 1993 and Bulgarian in 2005, 2009 and 2017.

== Maps ==
- Península Byers, Isla Livingston. Mapa topográfico a escala 1:25000. Madrid: Servicio Geográfico del Ejército, 1992. (Map image on p. 55 of the linked study)
- L.L. Ivanov et al. Antarctica: Livingston Island and Greenwich Island, South Shetland Islands. Scale 1:100000 topographic map. Sofia: Antarctic Place-names Commission of Bulgaria, 2005.
- L.L. Ivanov. Antarctica: Livingston Island and Greenwich, Robert, Snow and Smith Islands. Scale 1:120000 topographic map. Troyan: Manfred Wörner Foundation, 2009. ISBN 978-954-92032-6-4
- L.L. Ivanov. Antarctica: Livingston Island and Smith Island. Scale 1:100000 topographic map. Manfred Wörner Foundation, 2017.
- Antarctic Digital Database (ADD). Scale 1:250000 topographic map of Antarctica. Scientific Committee on Antarctic Research (SCAR). Since 1993, regularly updated
