= Robbery Beaches =

Series of beaches in Antarctica

Location of Byers Peninsula, Livingston Island in the South Shetland Islands

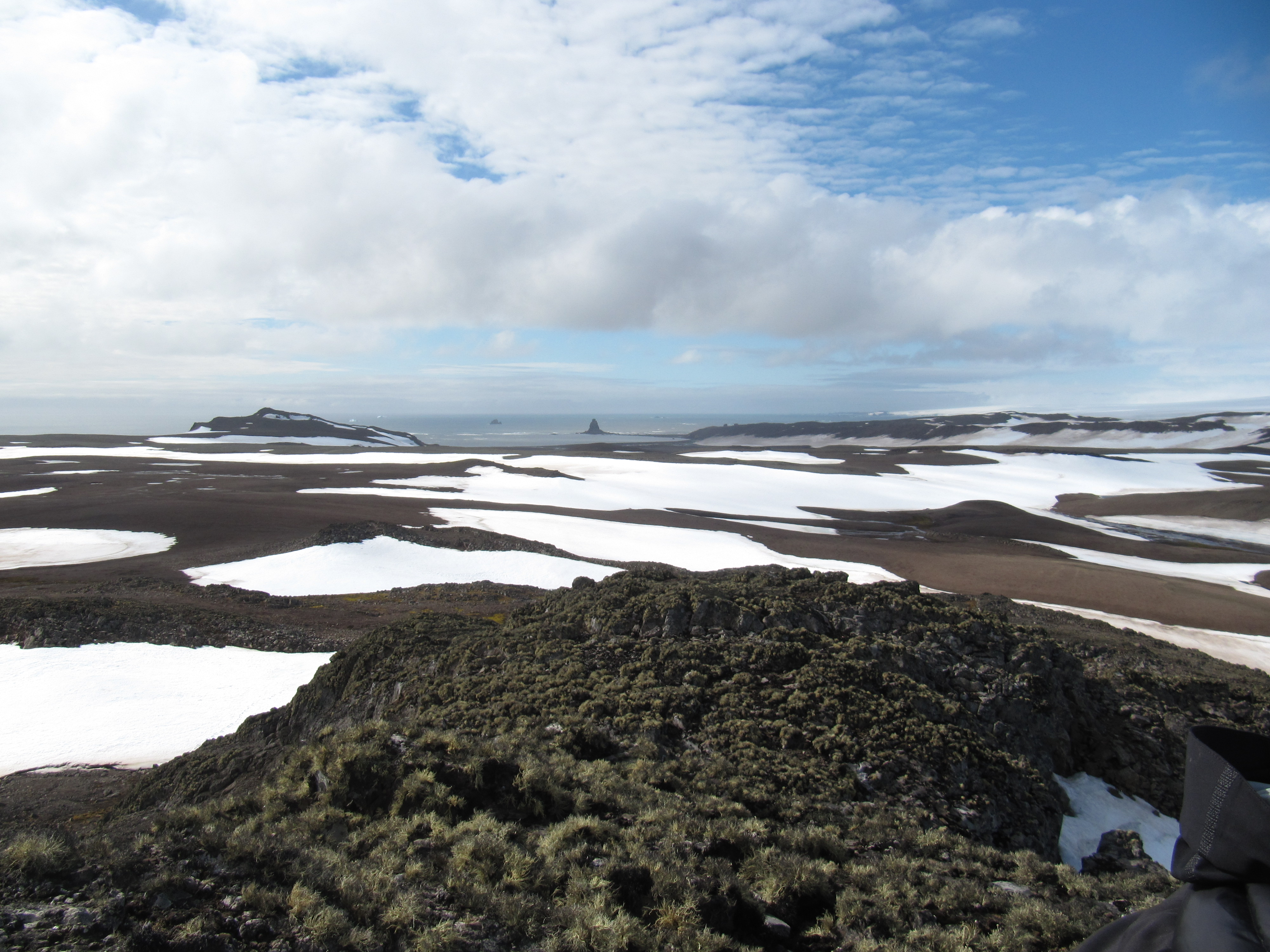
Robbery Beaches and Barclay Bay from near Basalt Lake on Byers Peninsula, Livingston Island, with left to right Lair Point, Frederick Rocks, Cutler Stack, Nedelya Point and the northern part of Urvich Wall in the middle ground, and Cape Shirreff and Ioannes Paulus II Peninsula in the right background

Robbery Beaches are beaches extending along the north side of Byers Peninsula, Livingston Island in the South Shetland Islands, Antarctica between Essex Point to the west and Nedelya Point to the east. They are crossed by Eridanus Stream and Bedek Stream.

The name ‘Robbery Beach’ was used by James Weddell in 1820–23. It arose from the English robbery of sealskins collected by the American brig Charity (Capt. Charles H. Barnard) of New York in January 1821. There was fierce competition between British and American sealers in the area during the early 1820s.

== Location ==
The beaches are centred at 62°36′57.6″S 61°04′58.8″W (British mapping in 1968, detailed Spanish mapping in 1992, and Bulgarian mapping in 2005 and 2009).

== Maps ==
- Chart of South Shetland including Coronation Island, &c. from the exploration of the sloop Dove in the years 1821 and 1822 by George Powell Commander of the same. Scale ca. 1:200000. London: Laurie, 1822
- Península Byers, Isla Livingston. Mapa topográfico a escala 1:25000. Madrid: Servicio Geográfico del Ejército, 1992. (Map image on p. 55 of the linked study)
- L.L. Ivanov et al. Antarctica: Livingston Island and Greenwich Island, South Shetland Islands. Scale 1:100000 topographic map. Sofia: Antarctic Place-names Commission of Bulgaria, 2005.
- L.L. Ivanov. Antarctica: Livingston Island and Greenwich, Robert, Snow and Smith Islands. Scale 1:120000 topographic map. Troyan: Manfred Wörner Foundation, 2009. ISBN 978-954-92032-6-4
- Antarctic Digital Database (ADD). Scale 1:250000 topographic map of Antarctica. Scientific Committee on Antarctic Research (SCAR). Since 1993, regularly upgraded and updated.
- L.L. Ivanov. Antarctica: Livingston Island and Smith Island. Scale 1:100000 topographic map. Manfred Wörner Foundation, 2017. ISBN 978-619-90008-3-0

== In fiction ==
Robbery Beaches are part of the mise-en-scène in the Antarctica thriller novel The Killing Ship authored by Elizabeth Cruwys and Beau Riffenburgh under their joint alias Simon Beaufort in 2016, and are shown on a sketch map of Livingston Island illustrating the book.

== Gallery ==
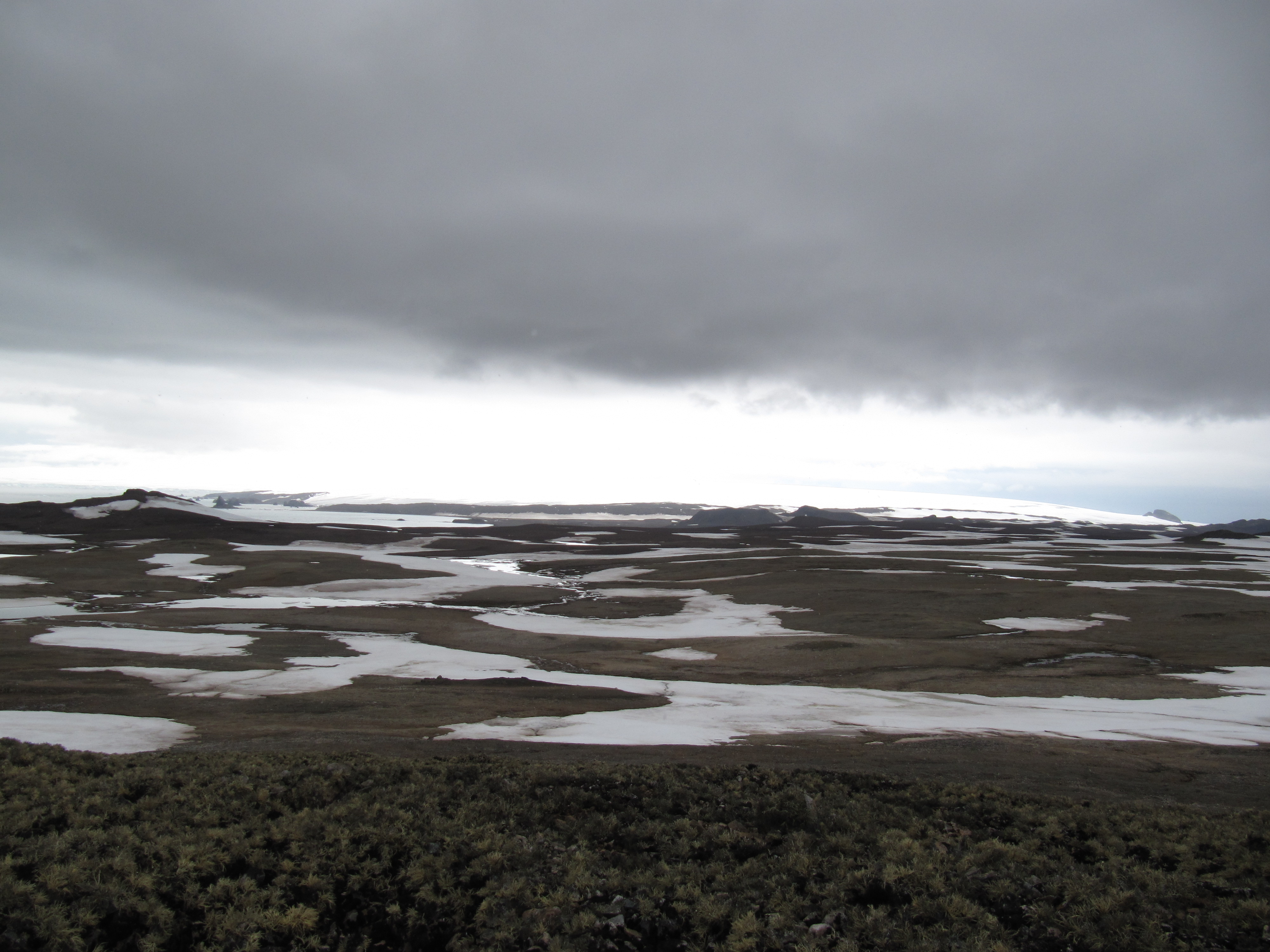
Eastern Byers Peninsula in Livingston Island with left to right Lair Hill, Robbery Beaches, Sparadok Point, Tsamblak Hill and Negro Hill in the middle ground; and Rowe Point, Cutler Stack, Ivanov Beach, Nedelya Point, Urvich Wall surmounted by the slopes of Rotch Dome, and Clark Nunatak in the background

Topographic map of Antarctic Specially Protected Area ASPA 126 Byers Peninsula

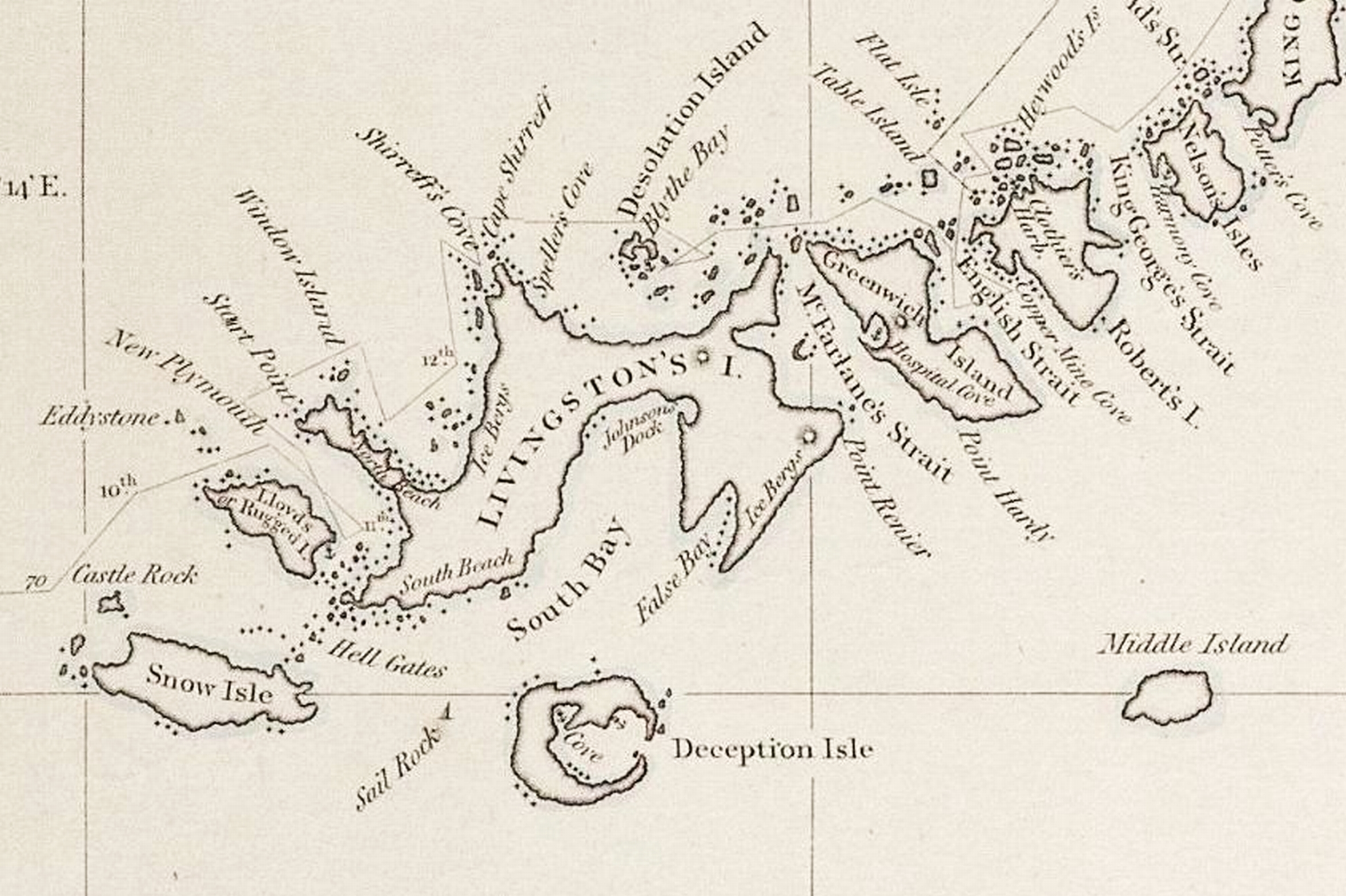
Fragment of George Powell's 1822 chart of the South Shetland Islands and South Orkney Islands featuring Robbery Beaches (as 'North Beach')

Topographic map of Livingston Island and Smith Island

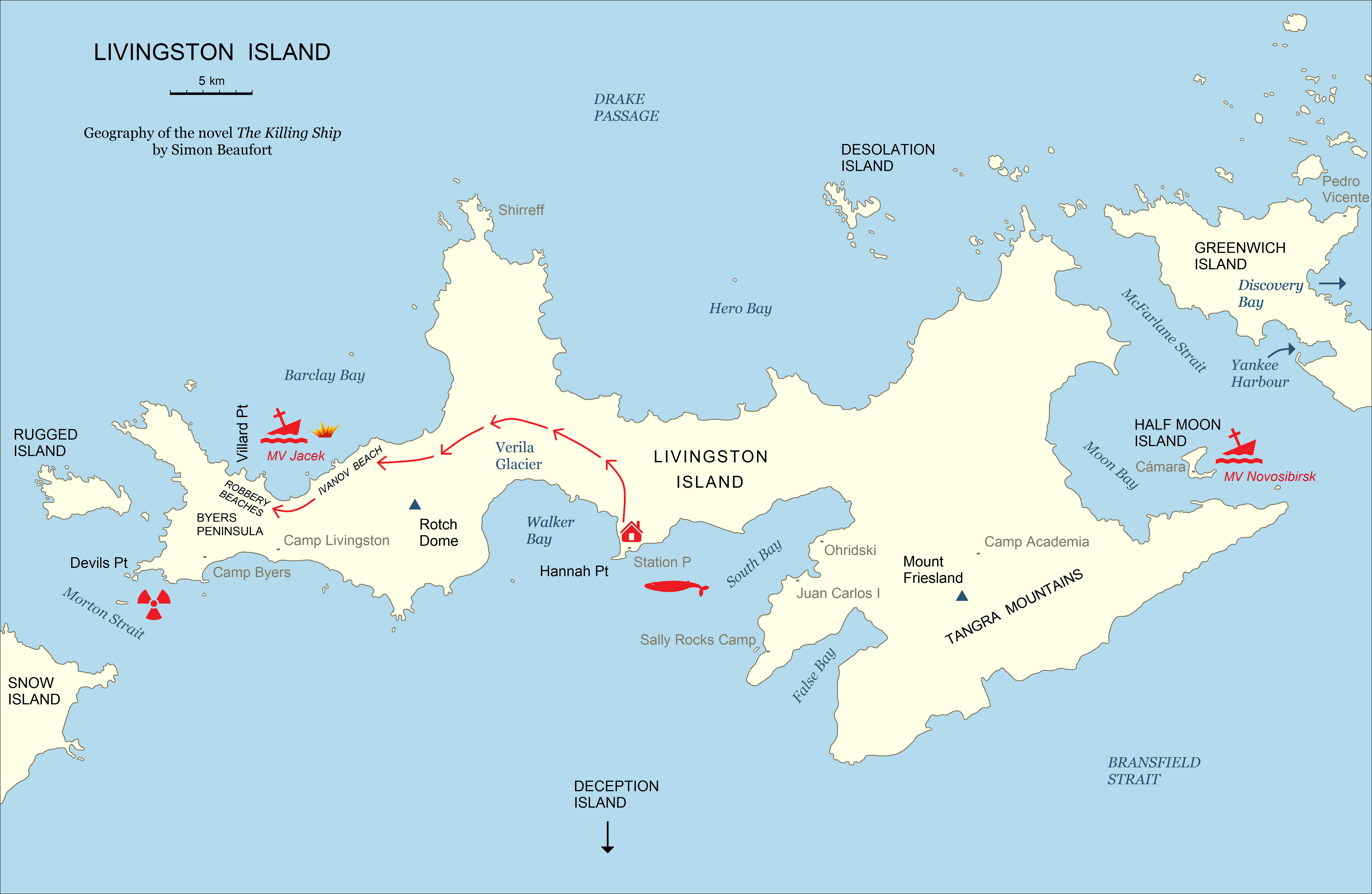
Geography of the novel
The Killing Ship by Simon Beaufort
