= Sparadok Point =

Sharp ice-free point in the South Shetland Islands, Antarctica

Location of Byers Peninsula on Livingston Island in the South Shetland Islands

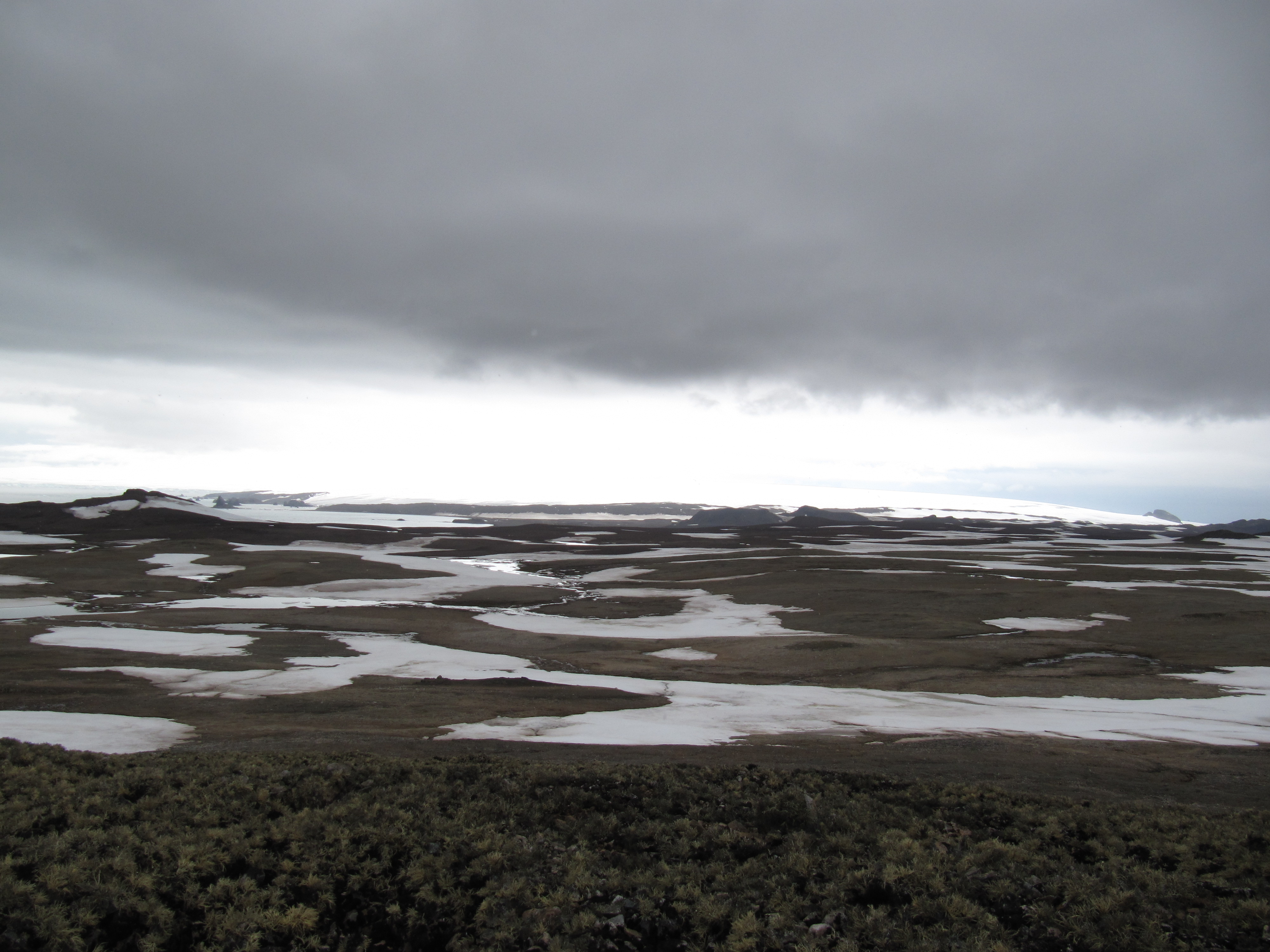
Eastern Byers Peninsula in Livingston Island with left to right Lair Hill, Robbery Beaches, Sparadok Point, Tsamblak Hill and Negro Hill in the middle ground; and Rowe Point, Cutler Stack, Ivanov Beach, Nedelya Point, Urvich Wall surmounted by the slopes of Rotch Dome, and Clark Nunatak in the background

Topographic map of Byers Peninsula featuring Antarctic Specially Protected Area ASPA 126 and its two restricted zones

Topographic map of Livingston Island and Smith Island.

Sparadok Point (Bulgarian: нос Спарадок, ‘Nos Sparadok’ \'nos spa-ra-'dok\) is a sharp ice-free point projecting 200 m from the coast of Byers Peninsula on Livingston Island in the South Shetland Islands, Antarctica with a shingle spit extending further 300 m northwards into Barclay Bay. It is surmounted by Tsamblak Hill. The area was visited by early 19th century sealers.

The point is named after the Thracian King Sparadok, 445-435 BC.

== Location ==
Sparadok Point is located at 62°37′34″S 61°00′01.4″W, which is 1.58 km southwest of Nedelya Point and 2.23 km southeast of Lair Point. British mapping in 1968, Spanish in 1992 and Bulgarian in 2005, 2009 and 2017.

== Maps ==
- Península Byers, Isla Livingston. Mapa topográfico a escala 1:25000. Madrid: Servicio Geográfico del Ejército, 1992.
- L.L. Ivanov et al. Antarctica: Livingston Island and Greenwich Island, South Shetland Islands. Scale 1:100000 topographic map. Sofia: Antarctic Place-names Commission of Bulgaria, 2005.
- L.L. Ivanov. Antarctica: Livingston Island and Greenwich, Robert, Snow and Smith Islands. Scale 1:120000 topographic map. Troyan: Manfred Wörner Foundation, 2009. ISBN 978-954-92032-6-4
