= Rowe Point =

Point in Livingston Island, South Shetland Islands

Location of Livingston Island in the South Shetland Islands

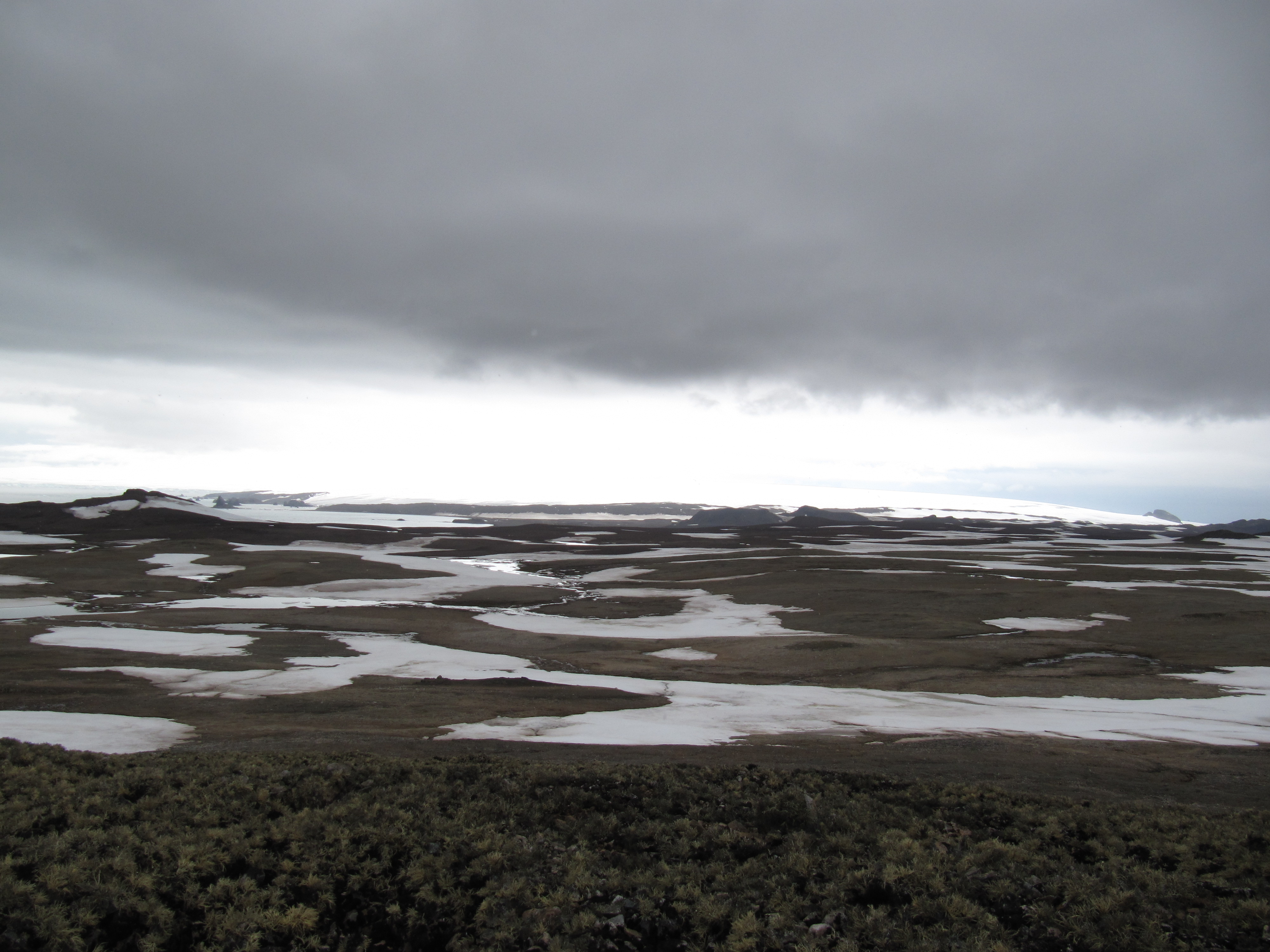
Eastern Byers Peninsula in Livingston Island with left to right Lair Hill, Robbery Beaches, Sparadok Point, Tsamblak Hill and Negro Hill in the middle ground; and Rowe Point, Cutler Stack, Ivanov Beach, Nedelya Point, Urvich Wall surmounted by the slopes of Rotch Dome, and Clark Nunatak in the background

Topographic map of Byers Peninsula featuring Antarctic Specially Protected Area ASPA 126 and its two restricted zones

Topographic map of Livingston Island and Smith Island

Rowe Point is a sharp, low ice-free point at the northeastern extremity of Ivanov Beach on the southeast coast of Barclay Bay in western Livingston Island in the South Shetland Islands, Antarctica. Mneme Lake is just west of the point.

The feature is part of the Antarctic Specially Protected Area ASPA 126 Byers Peninsula, in one of its restricted zones.

The point is named after Captain Henry Rowe, Master of the British sealing vessel Grace that operated out of the bay of New Plymouth, Livingston Island, in 1821–22.

== Location ==
Rowe Point is located at 62°35′30.8″S 60°54′02″W which is 4.6 km northeast of Nedelya Point, 3 km northeast of Bilyar Point, 14.64 km east by south of Essex Point, 15.93 km south-southwest of Cape Shirreff, 3 km west-southwest of Pascin Point and 4.69 km north by west of the highest point of Rotch Dome (British mapping in 1968 and Bulgarian in 2005 and 2009).

== Maps ==
- Península Byers, Isla Livingston. Mapa topográfico a escala 1:25000. Madrid: Servicio Geográfico del Ejército, 1992. (Map image on p. 55 of the linked study)
- L.L. Ivanov et al. Antarctica: Livingston Island and Greenwich Island, South Shetland Islands. Scale 1:100000 topographic map. Sofia: Antarctic Place-names Commission of Bulgaria, 2005.
- L.L. Ivanov. Antarctica: Livingston Island and Greenwich, Robert, Snow and Smith Islands. Scale 1:120000 topographic map. Troyan: Manfred Wörner Foundation, 2009. ISBN 978-954-92032-6-4
