= Pascin Point =

Location of Livingston Island in the South Shetland Islands

Topographic map featuring Pascin Point

Pascin Point (Bulgarian: нос Паскин, ‘Nos Pascin’ \'nos pas-'kin\) is the oval rocky point on the northwest coast of Livingston Island in Antarctica projecting 250 m north-northwestwards into Zornitsa Cove in Barclay Bay. It is named after the Bulgarian artist Jules Pascin (Julius Pincas, 1885-1930).

== Location ==
Pascin Point is located at 62°35′12″S 60°50′41″W, which is 3 km east-northeast of Rowe Point, 6.4 km southeast of Frederick Rocks and 5.82 km south of Scesa Point. British mapping in 1968, and Bulgarian in 2005, 2009 and 2017.

== Maps ==
- L.L. Ivanov et al. Antarctica: Livingston Island and Greenwich Island, South Shetland Islands. Scale 1:100000 topographic map. Sofia: Antarctic Place-names Commission of Bulgaria, 2005.
- L.L. Ivanov. Antarctica: Livingston Island and Greenwich, Robert, Snow and Smith Islands. Scale 1:120000 topographic map. Troyan: Manfred Wörner Foundation, 2009.
- Antarctic Digital Database (ADD). Scale 1:250000 topographic map of Antarctica. Scientific Committee on Antarctic Research (SCAR). Since 1993, regularly upgraded and updated
