= Cutler Stack =

Sea stack in Antarctica

Geography
- Location: Antarctica
- Coordinates: 62°36′44.5″S 60°58′51.5″W
- Archipelago: South Shetland Islands
- Length: 0.17 km (0.106 mi)
- Width: 0.15 km (0.093 mi)
- Highest elevation: 16 m (52 ft)

Administration
- Antarctica
- Administered under the Antarctic Treaty System

Demographics
- Population: uninhabited

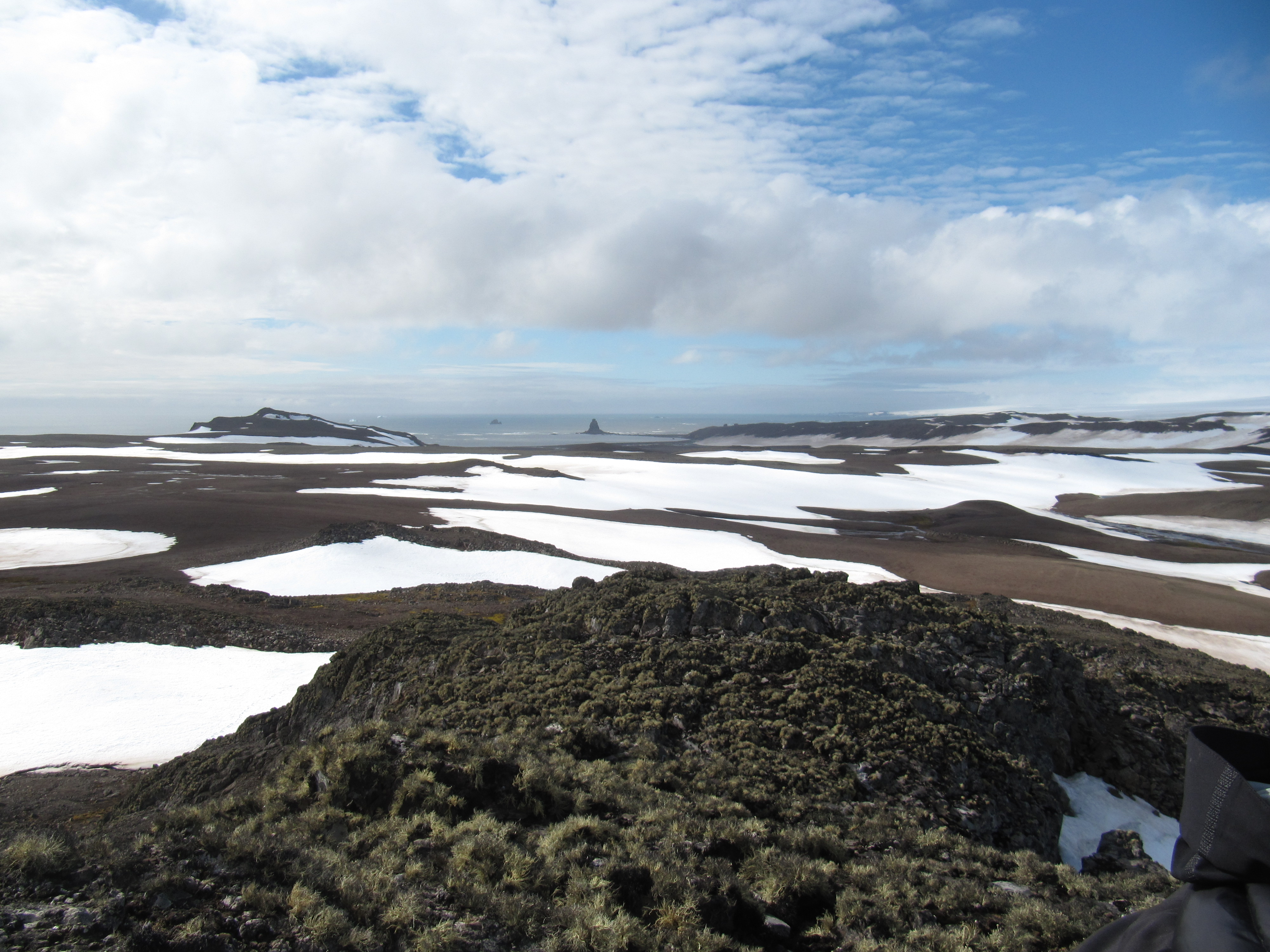
Barclay Bay and Robbery Beaches from near Basalt Lake on Byers Peninsula, Livingston Island, with left to right Lair Point, Frederick Rocks, Cutler Stack, Nedelya Point and the northern part of Urvich Wall in the middle ground, and Cape Shirreff and Ioannes Paulus II Peninsula in the right background

Cutler Stack is a conspicuous sea stack extending 170 by 150 m (186 by 164 yd) and rising to 16 m (52 ft), lying off Ivanov Beach in the south of Barclay Bay, western Livingston Island in the South Shetland Islands, Antarctica. The area was visited by early 19th century sealers.

The feature is named after Captain Benjamin Cutler, part owner of the American brig Frederick that visited the area in 1820–21, and Master of the sealing schooner Free Gift that visited the area in 1821–22; his name was found carved on a piece of whale vertebra excavated from a stone hut on Byers Peninsula by a FIDS survey party in 1957–58.

== Location ==
The stack is located at 62°36′44.5″S 60°58′51.5″W which is 300 m (328 yd) north-northwest of Nedelya Point, 2.8 km (1.7 mi) east-northeast of Lair Point and 4.72 km (2.93 mi) southwest of Rowe Point (British mapping in 1968, detailed Spanish mapping in 1992, and Bulgarian mapping in 2009 and 2017).

== See also ==
- Composite Antarctic Gazetteer
- List of Antarctic islands south of 60° S
- SCAR
- Territorial claims in Antarctica

== Maps ==
- Península Byers, Isla Livingston. Mapa topográfico a escala 1:25000. Madrid: Servicio Geográfico del Ejército, 1992. (Map image on p. 55 of the linked study)
- L.L. Ivanov. Antarctica: Livingston Island and Greenwich, Robert, Snow and Smith Islands. Scale 1:120000 topographic map. Troyan: Manfred Wörner Foundation, 2009. ISBN 978-954-92032-6-4

== Gallery ==
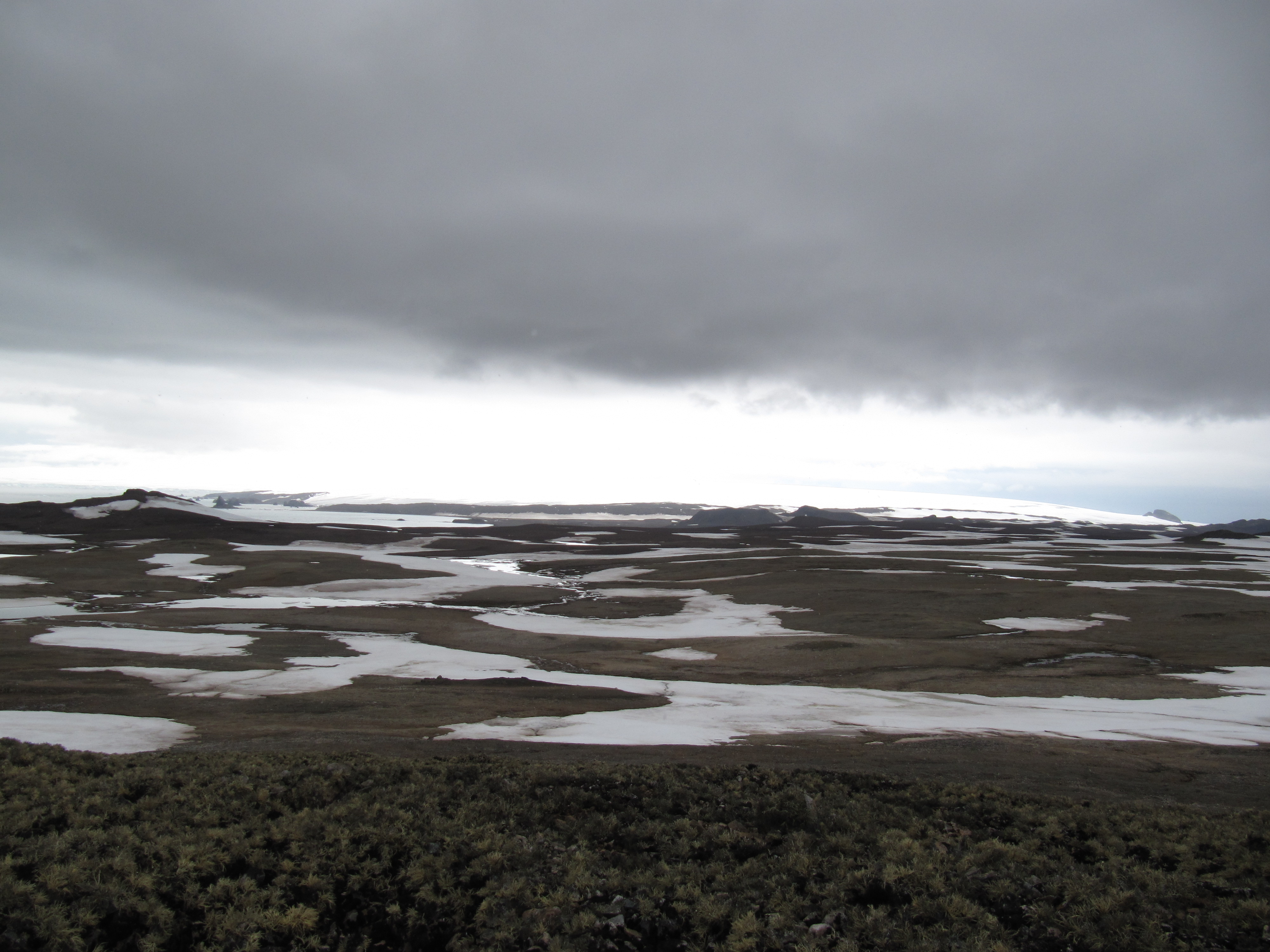
Eastern Byers Peninsula in Livingston Island with left to right Lair Hill, Robbery Beaches, Sparadok Point, Tsamblak Hill and Negro Hill in the middle ground; and Rowe Point, Cutler Stack, Ivanov Beach, Nedelya Point, Urvich Wall surmounted by the slopes of Rotch Dome, and Clark Nunatak in the background

Topographic map of Livingston Island, Greenwich, Robert, Snow and Smith Islands
