= Nedelya Point =

Sharp ice-free point in the South Shetland Islands, Antarctica

Location of Livingston Island in the South Shetland Islands

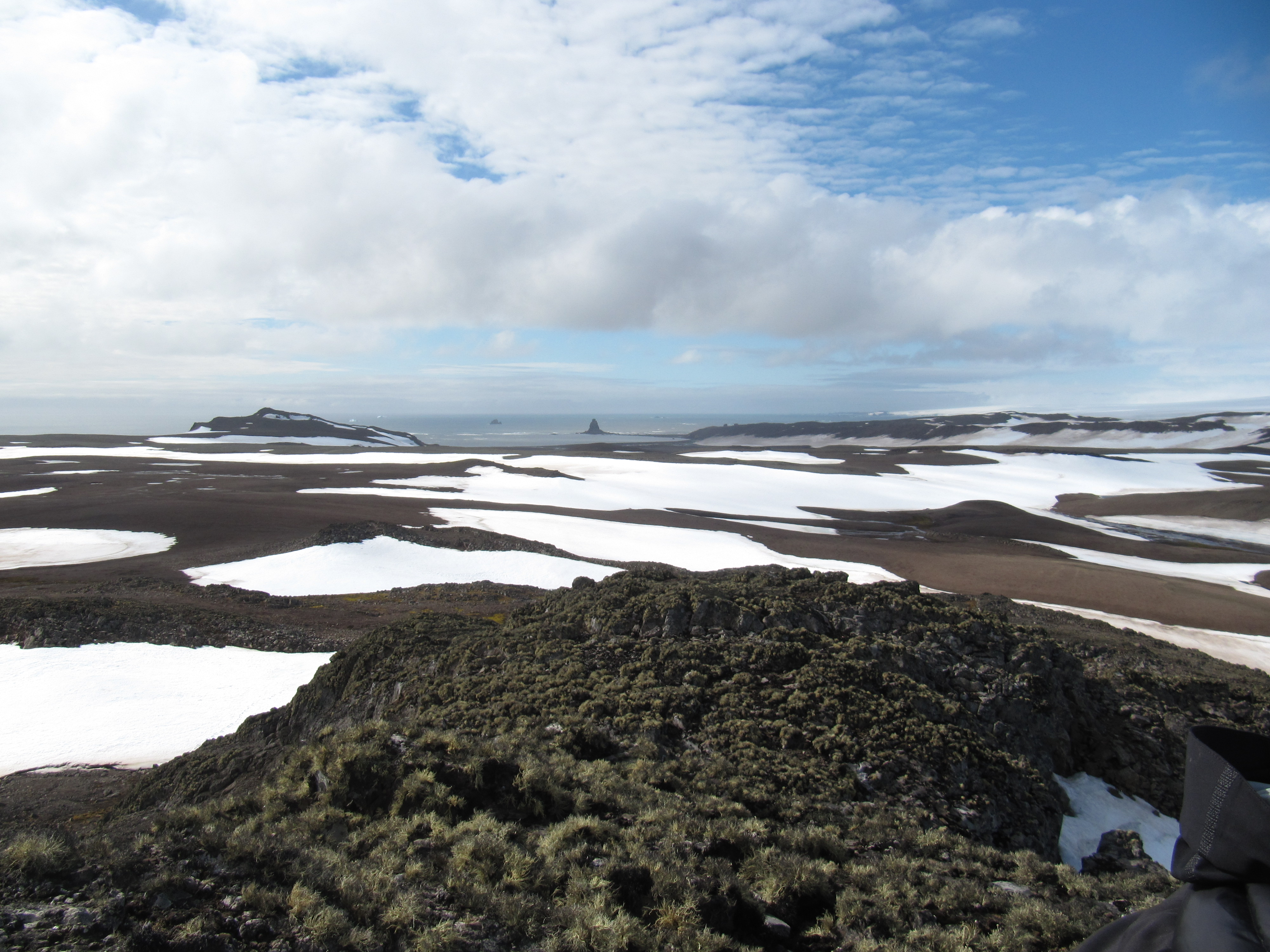
Barclay Bay and Robbery Beaches from near Basalt Lake on Byers Peninsula, Livingston Island. Visible from left to right are Lair Point, Frederick Rocks, Cutler Stack, Nedelya Point and the northern part of Urvich Wall in the middle ground, and Cape Shirreff and Ioannes Paulus II Peninsula in the right background.

Nedelya Point (Bulgarian: нос Неделя, ‘Nos Nedelya’ \'nos ne-'de-lya\) is a sharp ice-free point at the southwest extremity of Ivanov Beach on the north coast of Livingston Island in the South Shetland Islands, Antarctica, projecting 300 m into Barclay Bay. It is linked by a chain of rocks to Cutler Stack, located 310 m to the north-northwest. The feature was visited by a field party from the British base camp Station P during the summer season 1957/58. It is part of the Antarctic Specially Protected Area ASPA 126 Byers Peninsula, situated in one of its two restricted zones.

The point is named for Bulgarian educator Nedelya Petkova (1826–1894).

== Location ==
Nedelya Point is located at 62°36′55.6″S 60°58′48.5″W, which is 1.8 km southwest of Bilyar Point, 5.37 km west-northwest of Rotch Dome, 1.58 km northeast of Sparadok Point and 2.86 km east of Lair Point. British mapping was done in 1968, Chilean in 1971, Argentine in 1980, Spanish in 1993 and Bulgarian in 2005, 2009 and 2017.

== Maps ==
- Península Byers, Isla Livingston. Mapa topográfico a escala 1:25000. Madrid: Servicio Geográfico del Ejército, 1992.
- L.L. Ivanov et al. Antarctica: Livingston Island and Greenwich Island, South Shetland Islands. Scale 1:100000 topographic map. Sofia: Antarctic Place-names Commission of Bulgaria, 2005.
- L.L. Ivanov. Antarctica: Livingston Island and Greenwich, Robert, Snow and Smith Islands. Scale 1:120000 topographic map. Troyan: Manfred Wörner Foundation, 2009. ISBN 978-954-92032-6-4

== Gallery ==
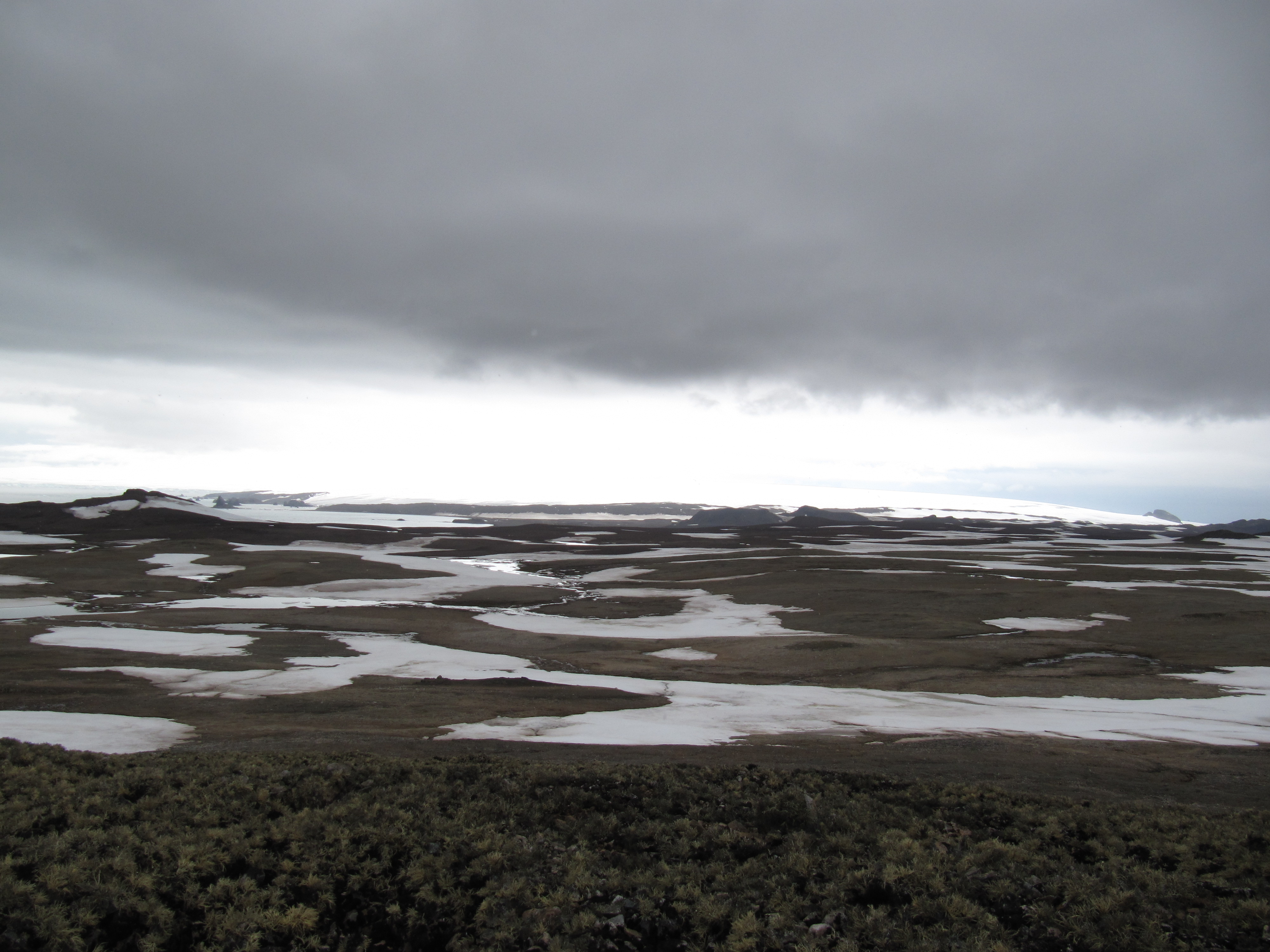
Eastern Byers Peninsula in Livingston Island. Visible from left to right are Lair Hill, Robbery Beaches, Sparadok Point, Tsamblak Hill and Negro Hill in the middle ground; and Rowe Point, Cutler Stack, Ivanov Beach, Nedelya Point, Urvich Wall surmounted by the slopes of Rotch Dome, and Clark Nunatak in the background.

Topographic map of Byers Peninsula featuring Antarctic Specially Protected Area ASPA 126 and its two restricted zones

Topographic map of Livingston Island and Smith Island
