= Cape Shirreff =

Cape in the South Shetland Islands of Antarctica

Coordinates: 62°27′32″S 60°47′19″W

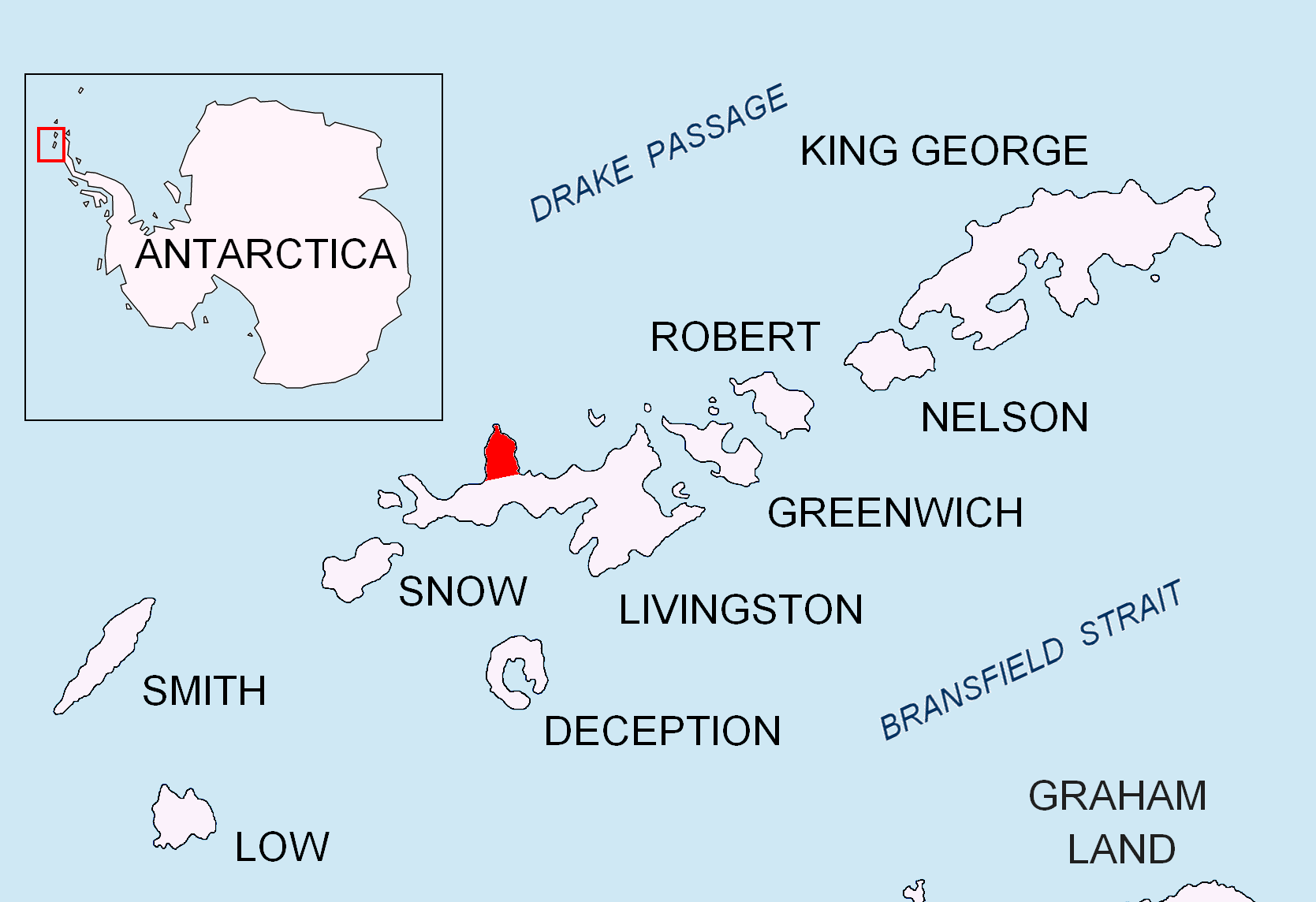
Location of Ioannes Paulus II Peninsula on Livingston Island in the South Shetland Islands

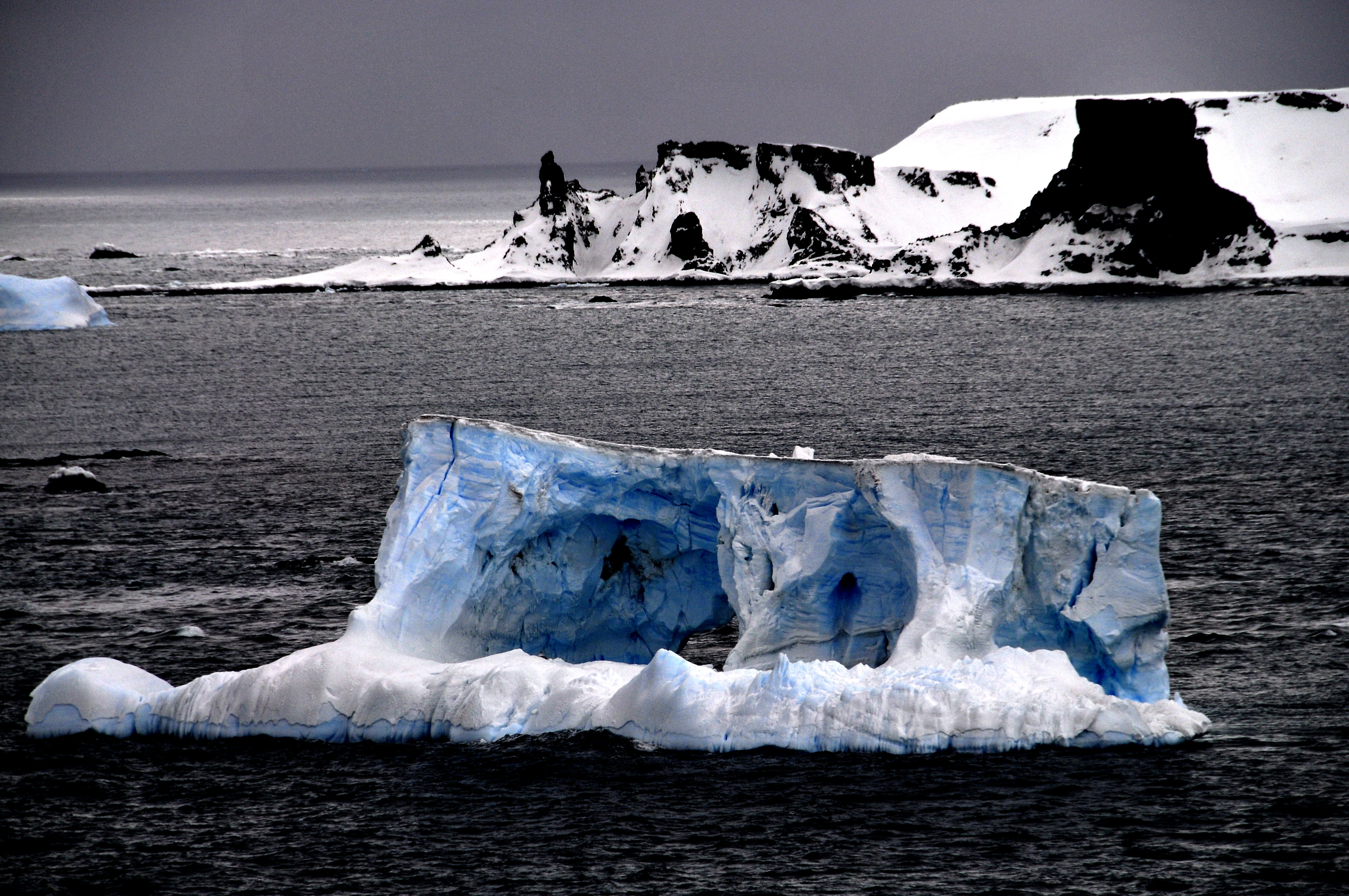
Cape Shirreff

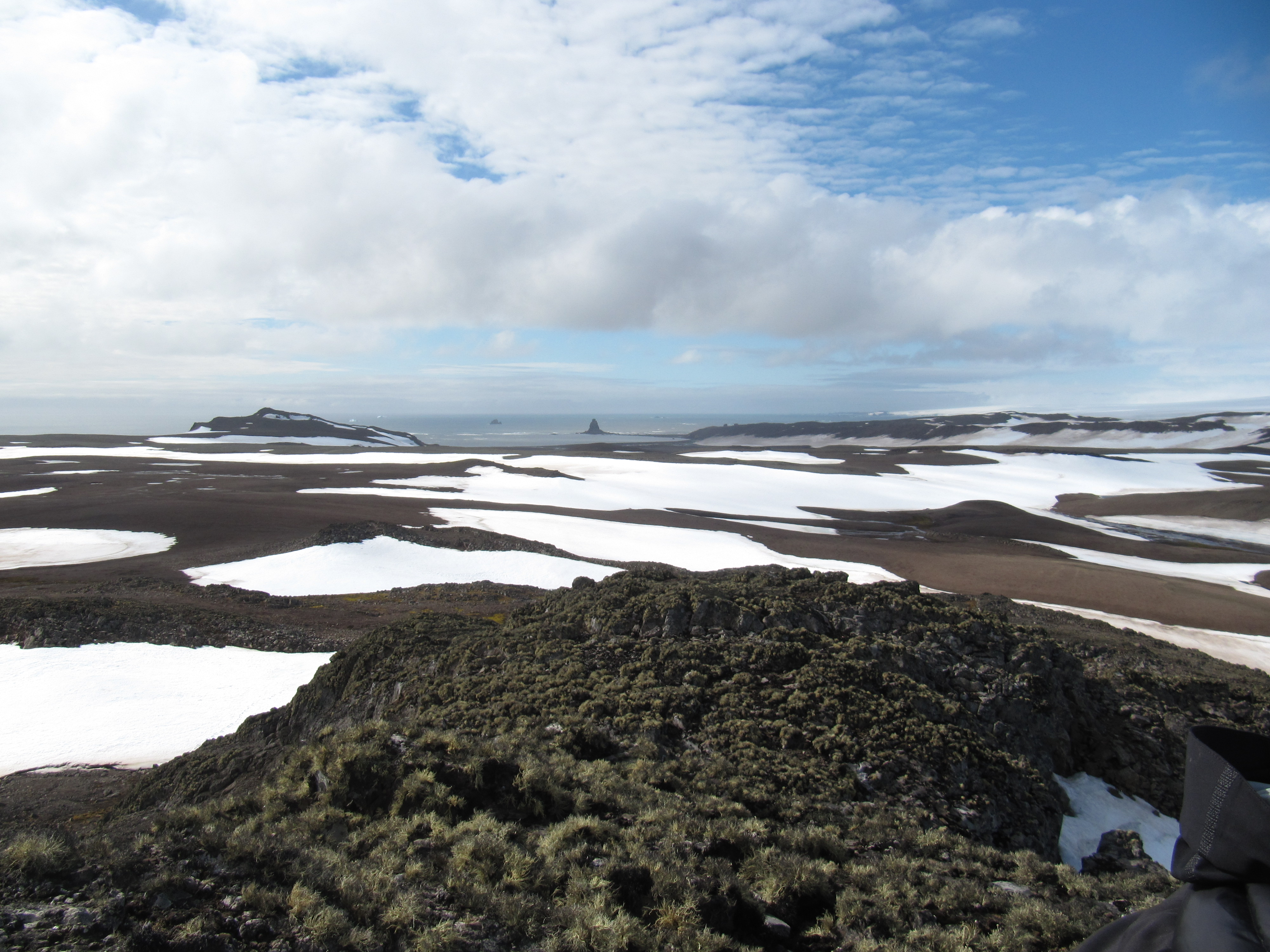
Barclay Bay and Robbery Beaches from near Basalt Lake on Byers Peninsula, Livingston Island, with left to right Lair Point, Frederick Rocks, Cutler Stack, Nedelya Point and the northern part of Urvich Wall in the middle ground, and Cape Shirreff and Ioannes Paulus II Peninsula in the right background

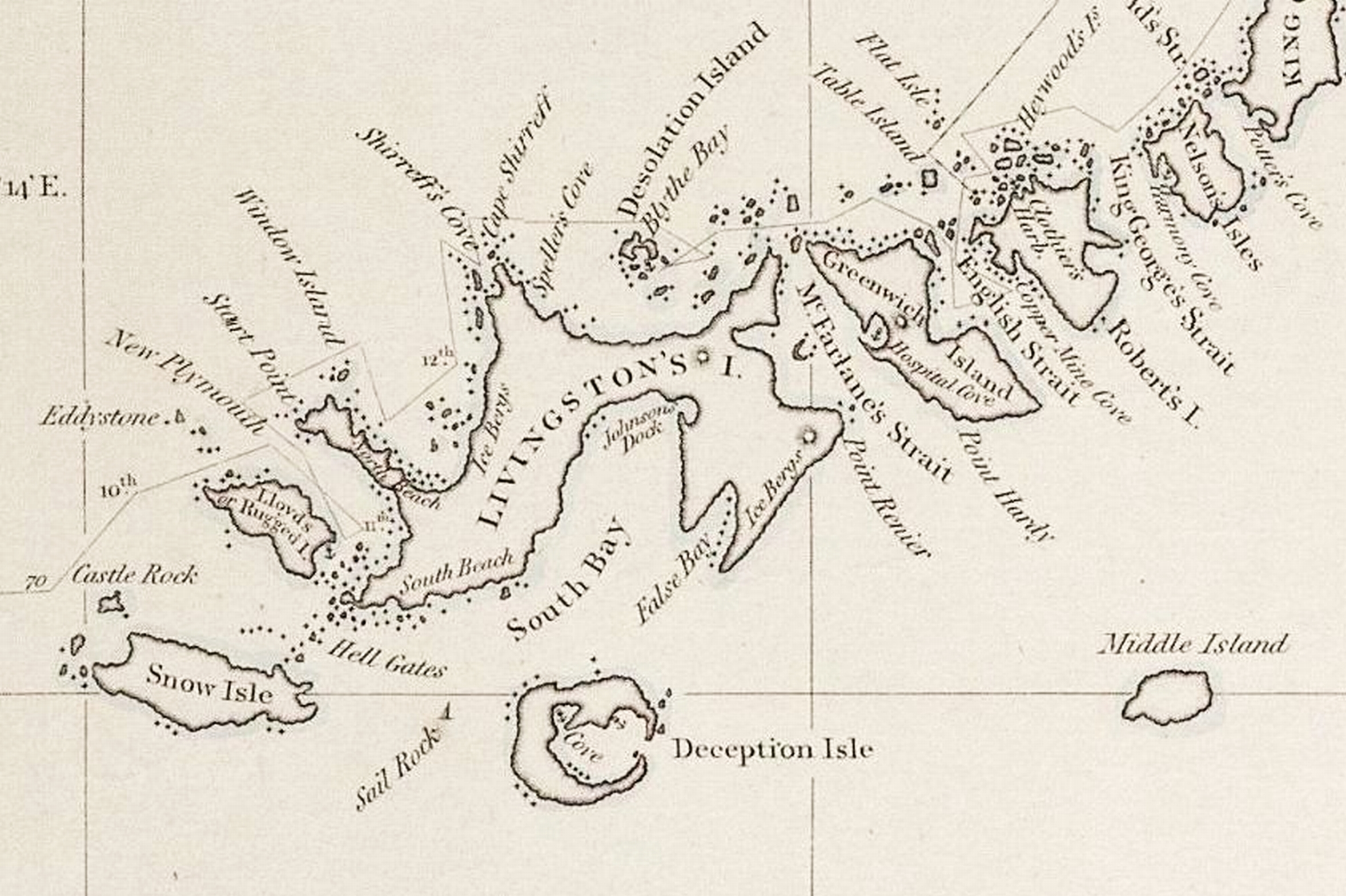
Fragment of George Powell's 1822 chart of the South Shetland Islands and South Orkney Islands featuring Cape Shirreff

Topographic map of Livingston Island

Cape Shirreff is a prominent cape at the north end of the rocky peninsula which separates Hero Bay and Barclay Bay on the north coast of Livingston Island, in the South Shetland Islands of Antarctica. The cape was named by Edward Bransfield in 1820 after Captain William H. Shirreff, the British commanding officer in the Pacific at that time.

The seasonal scientific field station Doctor Guillermo Mann Base has been operated by Chile since 1991 and the Shirreff Base (now Holt Watters Field Camp) by the USA since 1996.

== Description ==
Situated on a small, 3.22 km^{2} (1.24 sq mi) ice-free peninsula forming the northern extremity of Ioannes Paulus II Peninsula, which is protected by the Convention on the Conservation of Antarctic Marine Living Resources Ecosystem Monitoring Programme and requires a permit to enter. It is 24 km north-east of Essex Point, 34 km west-south-west of Williams Point and 21 km north-west of Siddins Point. Lying also 809 km south-south-east of Cape Horn, Cape Shirreff is the locality in the Antarctic Treaty area that is closest to a non-Antarctic territory.

== Fauna ==
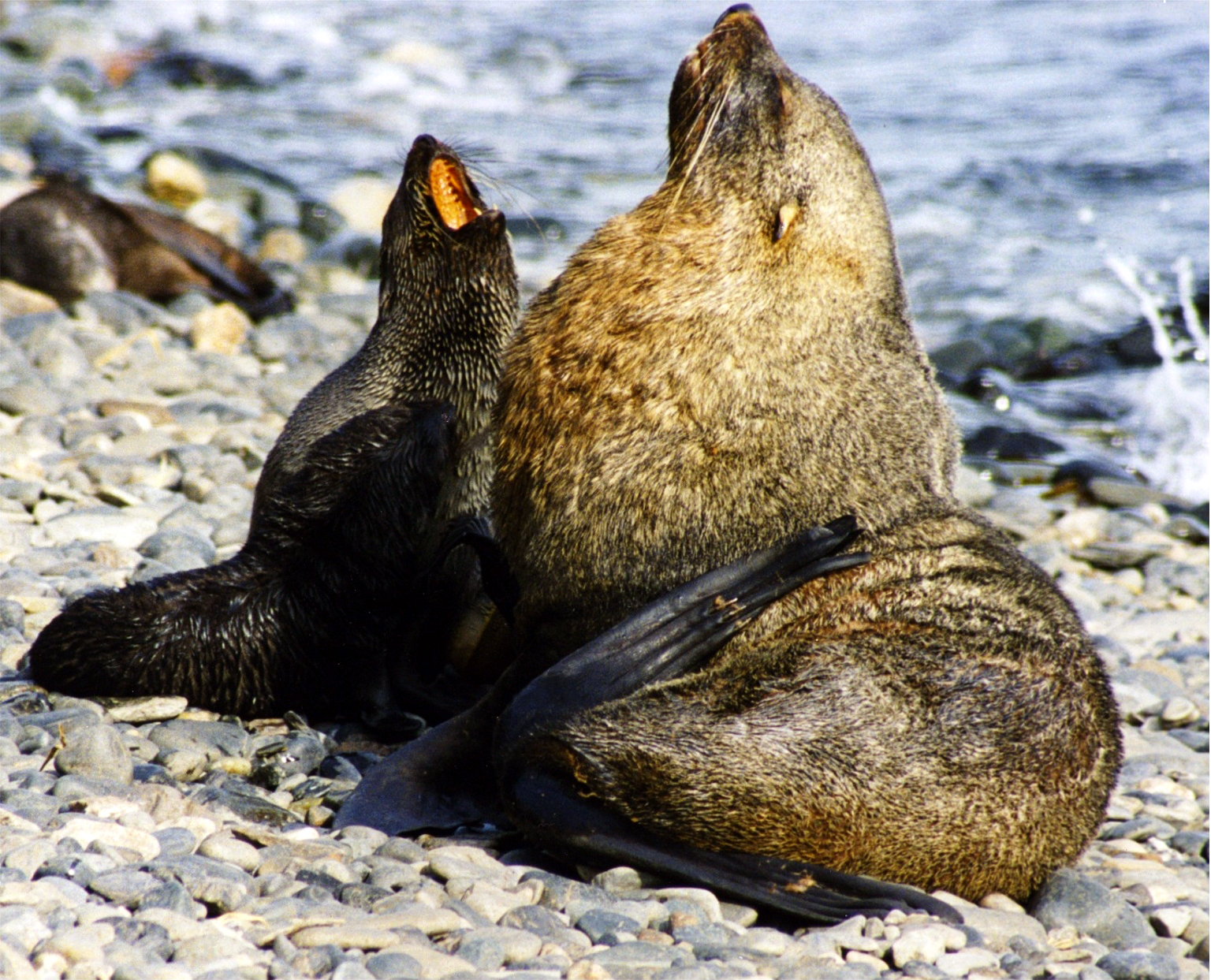
The cape is an important breeding site for Antarctic fur seals

The cape has been identified as an Important Bird Area (IBA) by BirdLife International because it supports a large breeding colony of up to about 10,000 pairs of chinstrap penguins. Other birds nesting at the site in smaller numbers include gentoo penguins, kelp gulls, brown skuas, snowy sheathbills, Antarctic terns, imperial shags, Wilson's and black-bellied storm petrels, and Cape petrels. The site also contains the largest number of breeding Antarctic fur seals in the Antarctic Peninsula region.

== Antarctic Specially Protected Area ==
The cape, with nearby San Telmo Island, has also been designated an Antarctic Specially Protected Area (ASPA 149) for the diversity of its plant and animal life, especially its penguin and fur seal breeding colonies.

== Maps ==
- Chart of South Shetland including Coronation Island, &c. from the exploration of the sloop Dove in the years 1821 and 1822 by George Powell Commander of the same. Scale ca. 1:200000. London: Laurie, 1822.
- South Shetland Islands. Scale 1:200000 topographic map. DOS 610 Sheet W 62 60. Tolworth, UK, 1968.
- Isla Elefante a Isla Trinidad. Mapa hidrográfico a escala 1:500000 - 1:350000. Valparaíso: Instituto Hidrográfico de la Armada de Chile, 1971.
- Islas Shetland del Sur de Isla 25 de Mayo a Isla Livingston. Mapa hidrográfico a escala 1:200000. Buenos Aires: Servicio de Hidrografía Naval de la Armada, 1980.
- Islas Livingston y Decepción. Mapa topográfico a escala 1:100000. Madrid: Servicio Geográfico del Ejército, 1991.
- S. Soccol, D. Gildea and J. Bath. Livingston Island, Antarctica. Scale 1:100000 satellite map. The Omega Foundation, USA, 2004.
- L.L. Ivanov et al., Antarctica: Livingston Island and Greenwich Island, South Shetland Islands (from English Strait to Morton Strait, with illustrations and ice-cover distribution), 1:100000 scale topographic map, Antarctic Place-names Commission of Bulgaria, Sofia, 2005
- L.L. Ivanov. Antarctica: Livingston Island and Greenwich, Robert, Snow and Smith Islands. Scale 1:120000 topographic map. Troyan: Manfred Wörner Foundation, 2010. ISBN 978-954-92032-9-5 (First edition 2009. ISBN 978-954-92032-6-4)
- Antarctic Digital Database (ADD). Scale 1:250000 topographic map of Antarctica. Scientific Committee on Antarctic Research (SCAR). Since 1993, regularly upgraded and updated.
- L.L. Ivanov. Antarctica: Livingston Island and Smith Island. Scale 1:100000 topographic map. Manfred Wörner Foundation, 2017. ISBN 978-619-90008-3-0

== See also ==
- Shirreff Base
- Doctor Guillermo Mann Base
