= Urvich Wall =

Narrow ice-free and crescent-shaped ridge in the South Shetland Islands, Antarctica

Location of Byers Peninsula on Livingston Island in the South Shetland Islands

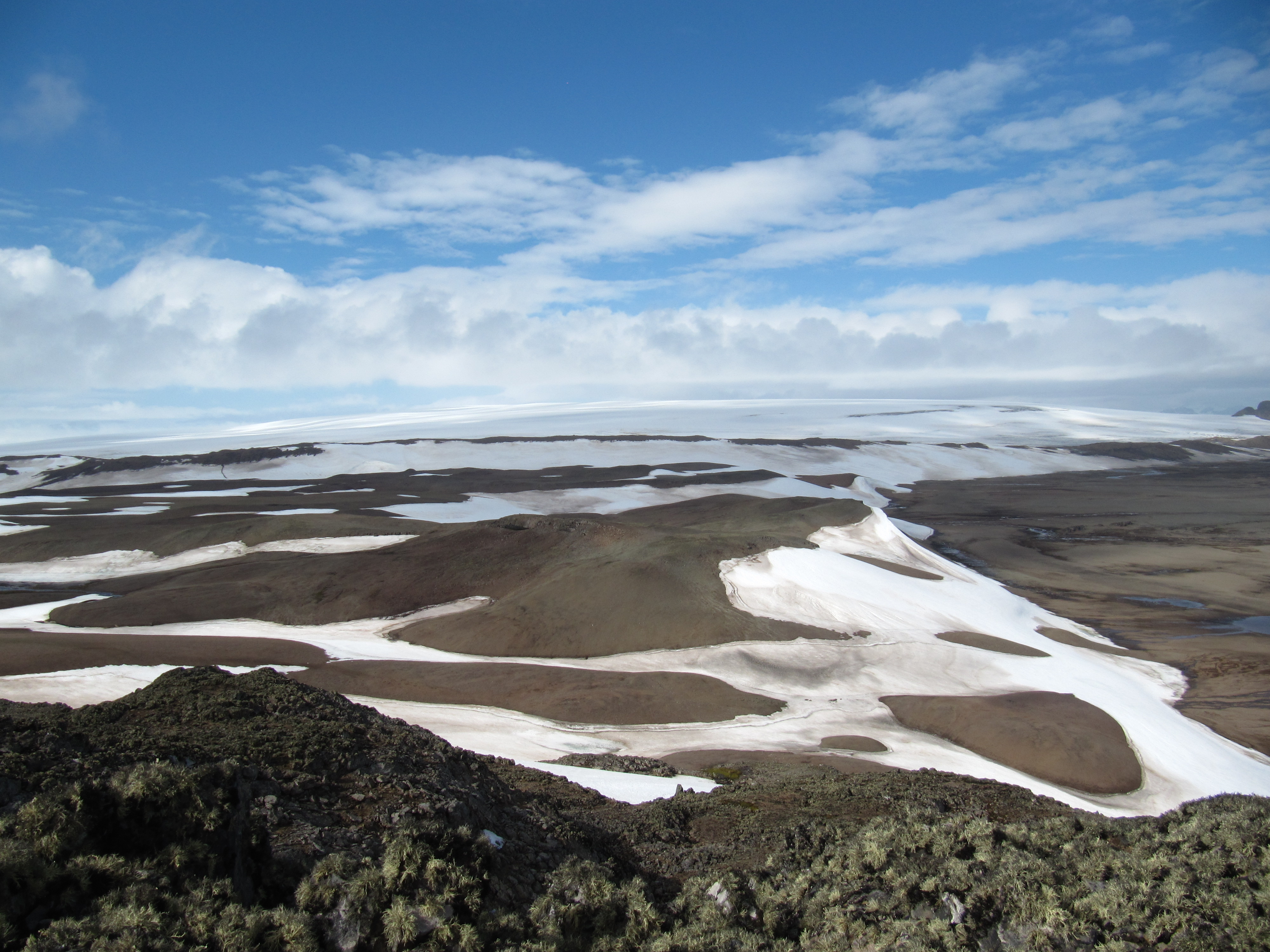
Urvich Wall and Rotch Dome from near Basalt Lake on Byers Peninsula, Livingston Island in Antarctica

Urvich Wall (Bulgarian: Урвичка стена, ‘Urvichka Stena’ \'ur-vich-ka ste-'na\) is the narrow ice-free and crescent-shaped ridge rising to 121 m on Livingston Island in the South Shetland Islands, Antarctica and bounded by Nedelya Point to the north and Rish Point to the southeast. The ridge is 6.7 km long and up to 400 m wide, and separates Byers Peninsula to the west from Rotch Dome to the east. It surmounts Oread Lake, Montemno Lake and Bedek Stream on the west.

The feature's northern part lies in the Antarctic Specially Protected Area ASPA 126 Byers Peninsula, more specifically in one of its two restricted zones.

The ridge is named after the medieval fortress of Urvich in Plana Mountain, Bulgaria.

== Location ==
Urvich Wall is centred at 62°38′50.5″S 60°57′45.8″W. Spanish mapping in 1992, and Bulgarian in 2005 and 2009.

== Maps ==
- Península Byers, Isla Livingston. Mapa topográfico a escala 1:25000. Madrid: Servicio Geográfico del Ejército, 1992.
- L.L. Ivanov et al. Antarctica: Livingston Island and Greenwich Island, South Shetland Islands. Scale 1:100000 topographic map. Sofia: Antarctic Place-names Commission of Bulgaria, 2005.
- L.L. Ivanov. Antarctica: Livingston Island and Greenwich, Robert, Snow and Smith Islands. Scale 1:120000 topographic map. Troyan: Manfred Wörner Foundation, 2009. ISBN 978-954-92032-6-4
- Antarctic Digital Database (ADD). Scale 1:250000 topographic map of Antarctica. Scientific Committee on Antarctic Research (SCAR). Since 1993, regularly upgraded and updated.
- L.L. Ivanov. Antarctica: Livingston Island and Smith Island. Scale 1:100000 topographic map. Manfred Wörner Foundation, 2017. ISBN 978-619-90008-3-0

== Gallery ==
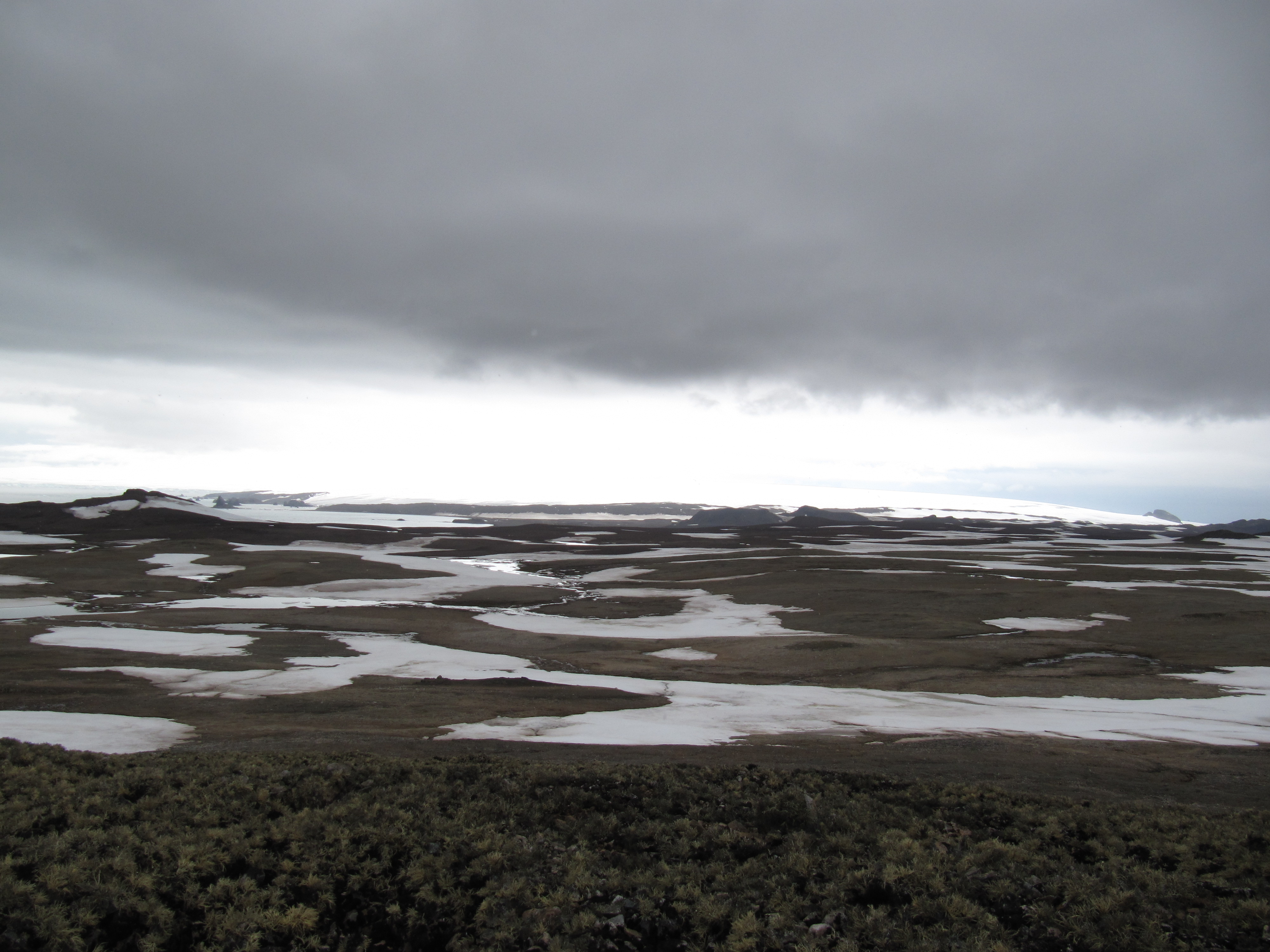
Eastern Byers Peninsula in Livingston Island with left to right Lair Hill, Robbery Beaches, Sparadok Point, Tsamblak Hill and Negro Hill in the middle ground; and Rowe Point, Cutler Stack, Ivanov Beach, Nedelya Point, Urvich Wall surmounted by Rotch Dome, and Clark Nunatak in the background

Topographic map of Byers Peninsula featuring Antarctic Specially Protected Area ASPA 126 and its two restricted zones

Topographic map of Livingston Island
