= Beau Riffenburgh =

British/American author and historian (born 1955)

- Born: 1955 (age 70–71)
- Education: University of Cambridge
- Occupations: Author; historian
- Spouse: Liz Cruwys
- Writing career
- Pen name: Simon Beaufort

Beau Riffenburgh (born 1955) is a British/American author and historian specializing in polar exploration. He also formerly was an American football coach and author of books on football history.

== Early career ==
A native of California, Riffenburgh earned a BA from the University of California, Irvine and a Master's from the University of Southern California. He was the Senior Writer and Director of Research for NFL Properties in the 1980s. While there, he wrote or edited eight books, including The Official NFL Encyclopedia. He served briefly as editor-in-chief for Total Sports Publishing.

== Polar research ==
Riffenburgh earned his doctorate at the Scott Polar Research Institute at the University of Cambridge. From 1992 to 2006, he served as the editor of Polar Record, the world's oldest journal of polar research. He also was the head of the Polar History Group at the Scott Polar Research Institute and a lecturer in the History Faculty of the University of Cambridge.

Riffenburgh has written or edited more than 30 books on exploration, including The Myth of the Explorer, an examination of the relationship of the popular press with exploration; Nimrod, the story of Ernest Shackleton's Nimrod Expedition, which almost attained both the South Pole and the South Magnetic Pole; and Aurora, the tale of Douglas Mawson's Australasian Antarctic Expedition. He was the editor of the Encyclopedia of the Antarctic, a two-volume work that is the most comprehensive reference work ever produced about the Antarctic.

Riffenburgh's major scholarly book not related to the polar regions is Pinkerton’s Great Detective, a biography of James McParland, whose undercover exploits brought down the Molly Maguires in the Pennsylvania coal fields. He has also written three books on Titanic, including the best-selling The Titanic Experience.

== Coaching career ==
While at Cambridge, Riffenburgh served as the head coach of Cambridge's American football team in the British Collegiate American Football League. He was named National Coach of the Year twice in his five seasons (1991–1996). Riffenburgh later spent one season as head coach of the University of Hertfordshire Hurricanes. The team went undefeated and won the National Championship during the 1997–1998 season, and he was again named National Coach of the Year.

Riffenburgh was the first head coach of the Great Britain Bulldogs, the national university American football team, which won the first two European Championships in 1994 and 1996.

He was inducted into the BCAFL's Hall of Fame in 2000 as part of the Hall's founding class. He also was inducted in the founding class of the British American Football Association's Hall of Fame, the only university representative so honoured.

== Mystery novels ==
Riffenburgh has written numerous mystery novels with his wife, Elizabeth Cruwys, under the pseudonym Simon Beaufort.

== Partial bibliography ==
=== Books on exploration ===
- With Shackleton and Mawson: The Antarctic Diaries of Frank Wild (2022, with Angie Butler)
- Shackleton’s Critic: The Life And Diaries of Eric Stewart Marshall (2020, with Angie Butler)
- The Antarctic Diary of Archibald Lang McLean (2020)
- A Tragedy of Errors: The Saga of the Disastrous Jeannette Expedition (2019)
- Into the Mists: S.A. Andrée’s Balloon Expeditions Towards the North Pole (2018)
- The Antarctic Diaries of Alexander Lorimer Kennedy (2018, with Clive Wilson-Roberts and Mark Pharaoh)
- The Antarctic Diaries of Andrew Dougald Watson (2018)
- Norway and Argentina: The Antarctic Connection (2018, with Geir O. Kløver)
- The Great Explorers and Their Journeys (2017)
- Eivind Astrup: The Norwegian Ski and Sledge Expert with Peary (2017)
- Carsten Borchgrevink and the Southern Cross Expedition, 1898–1900 (2017)
- The Exploration Treasury (2017)
- C.A. Larsen – Explorer, Whaler, & Family Man (2016)
- Exploring Shackleton (2015)
- Robert Falcon Scott and the Terra Nova Expedition 1910–13 (2014)
- Mertz and I: The Antarctic Diary of Belgrave Edward Sutton Ninnis (2012, with Allan Mornement)
- The Men Who Mapped the World (2011)
- Aurora: Douglas Mawson and the Australasian Antarctic Expedition, 1911–14 (2011)
- The Science of Captain Scott’s Terra Nova Expedition, 1910-13 (2011)
- The Royal Geographical Society Polar Exploration Experience (2009)
- Racing with Death: Douglas Mawson, Antarctic Explorer (2008)
- The Royal Geographical Society Exploration Experience (2007)
- Encyclopedia of the Antarctic (2006)
- Shackleton's Forgotten Expedition: The Voyage of the Nimrod (2004)
- Nimrod: Ernest Shackleton and the Extraordinary Story of the 1907–09 British Antarctic Expedition (2004)
- With Scott to the Pole (2004, with Elizabeth Cruwys and H.J.P. Arnold)
- The Photographs of H.G. Ponting (1998, with Elizabeth Cruwys)
- The Myth of the Explorer : The Press, Sensationalism, and Geographical Discovery (1993)

=== Books on football ===
- The American Football Almanac (1991, with Ken Thomas)
- The Official History of Pro Football (1990, with Jack Clary)
- Great Ones: NFL Quarterbacks from Montana to Baugh (1989, with David Boss)
- The Official NFL Encyclopedia (1986)
- Running Wild: A Pictorial Tribute to the NFL's Greatest runners (1984, with David Boss)
- The Encyclopedic History of Pro Football (1982)

=== Mystery Novels ===
- Watchers of the Dead (2019)
- Mind of A Killer (2017)
- The Killing Ship (2016)
- The Murder House (2013)
- The Nimrod Murders (2011)
- A Dead Man's Secret (2010)
- The Bloodstained Throne (2010)
- Deadly Inheritance (2009)
- The Coiners' Quarrel (2004)
- The King's Spies (2003)
- The Bishop's Brood (2003)
- A Head for Poisoning (1998)
- Murder in the Holy City (1998)
