= Barclay Bay =

Bay on the north side of Livingston Island in the South Shetland Islands

Location of Livingston Island in the South Shetland Islands

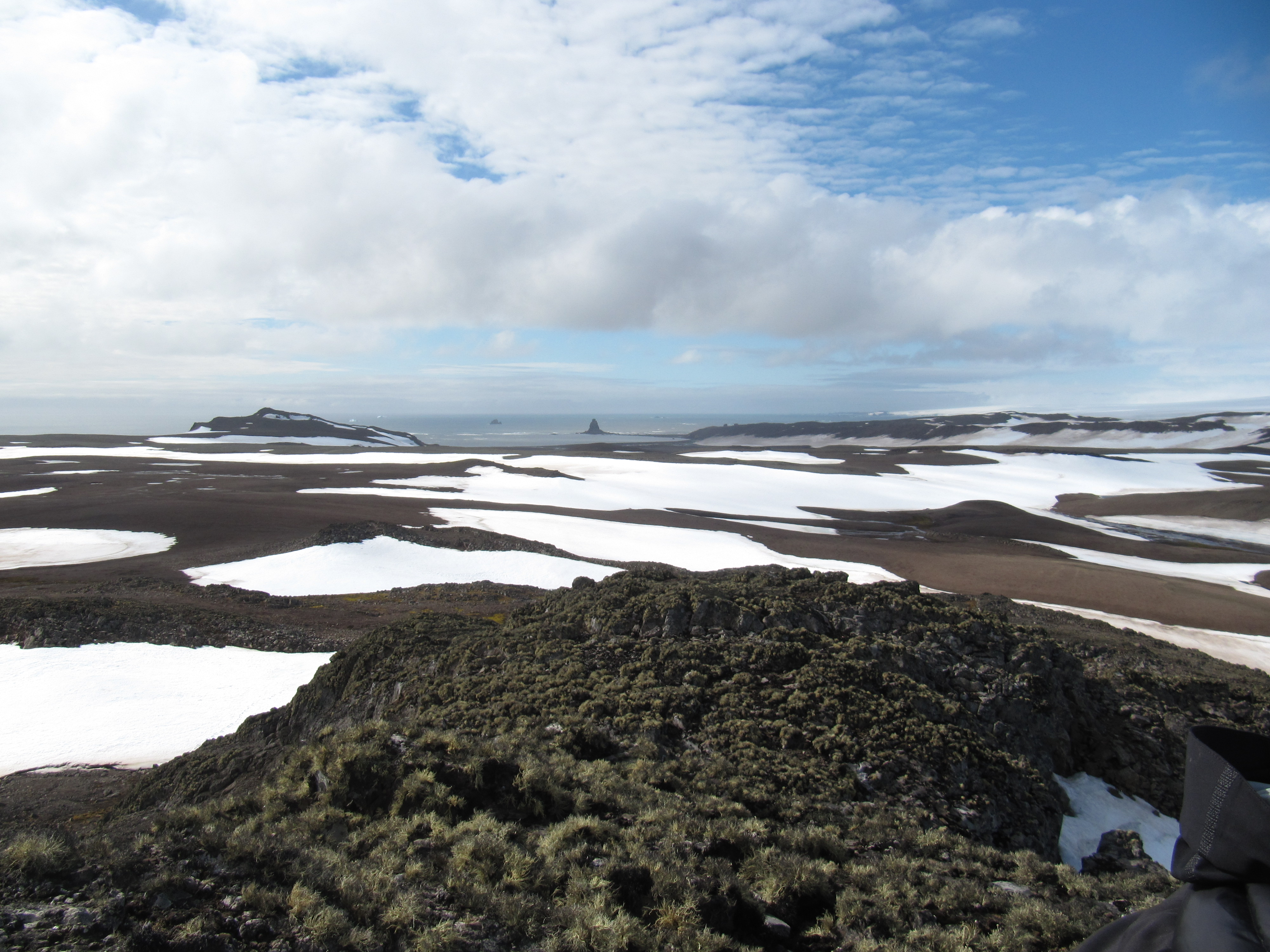
Barclay Bay and Robbery Beaches from near Basalt Lake on Byers Peninsula, Livingston Island. Visible from left to right are Lair Point, Frederick Rocks, Cutler Stack, Nedelya Point and the northern part of Urvich Wall in the middle ground, and Cape Shirreff and Ioannes Paulus II Peninsula in the right background.

Barclay Bay (62°33′S 60°58′W) is a bay in the Drake Passage between Cape Shirreff and Essex Point on the north side of Livingston Island, in the South Shetland Islands. Its head is fed by Etar Snowfield. The name appears on an 1825 chart of the British sealing expedition under James Weddell, and is now established in international usage.

== Maps ==
- South Shetland Islands. Scale 1:200000 topographic map No. 5657. DOS 610 – W 62 60. Tolworth, UK, 1968.
- Islas Livingston y Decepción. Mapa topográfico a escala 1:100000. Madrid: Servicio Geográfico del Ejército, 1991.
- L.L. Ivanov et al. Antarctica: Livingston Island and Greenwich Island, South Shetland Islands. Scale 1:100000 topographic map. Sofia: Antarctic Place-names Commission of Bulgaria, 2005.
- L.L. Ivanov. Antarctica: Livingston Island and Greenwich, Robert, Snow and Smith Islands. Scale 1:120000 topographic map. Troyan: Manfred Wörner Foundation, 2009. ISBN 978-954-92032-6-4
- Antarctic Digital Database (ADD). Scale 1:250000 topographic map of Antarctica. Scientific Committee on Antarctic Research (SCAR). Since 1993, regularly upgraded and updated.
- L.L. Ivanov. Antarctica: Livingston Island and Smith Island. Scale 1:100000 topographic map. Manfred Wörner Foundation, 2017. ISBN 978-619-90008-3-0

== In fiction ==
Barclay Bay is part of the mise-en-scène in the Antarctica thriller novel The Killing Ship authored by Elizabeth Cruwys and Beau Riffenburgh under their joint alias Simon Beaufort in 2016. The plot involves a ship sent to the bottom of the bay, which is shown on a sketch map of Livingston Island illustrating the book.

== Gallery ==
Topographic map of Livingston Island

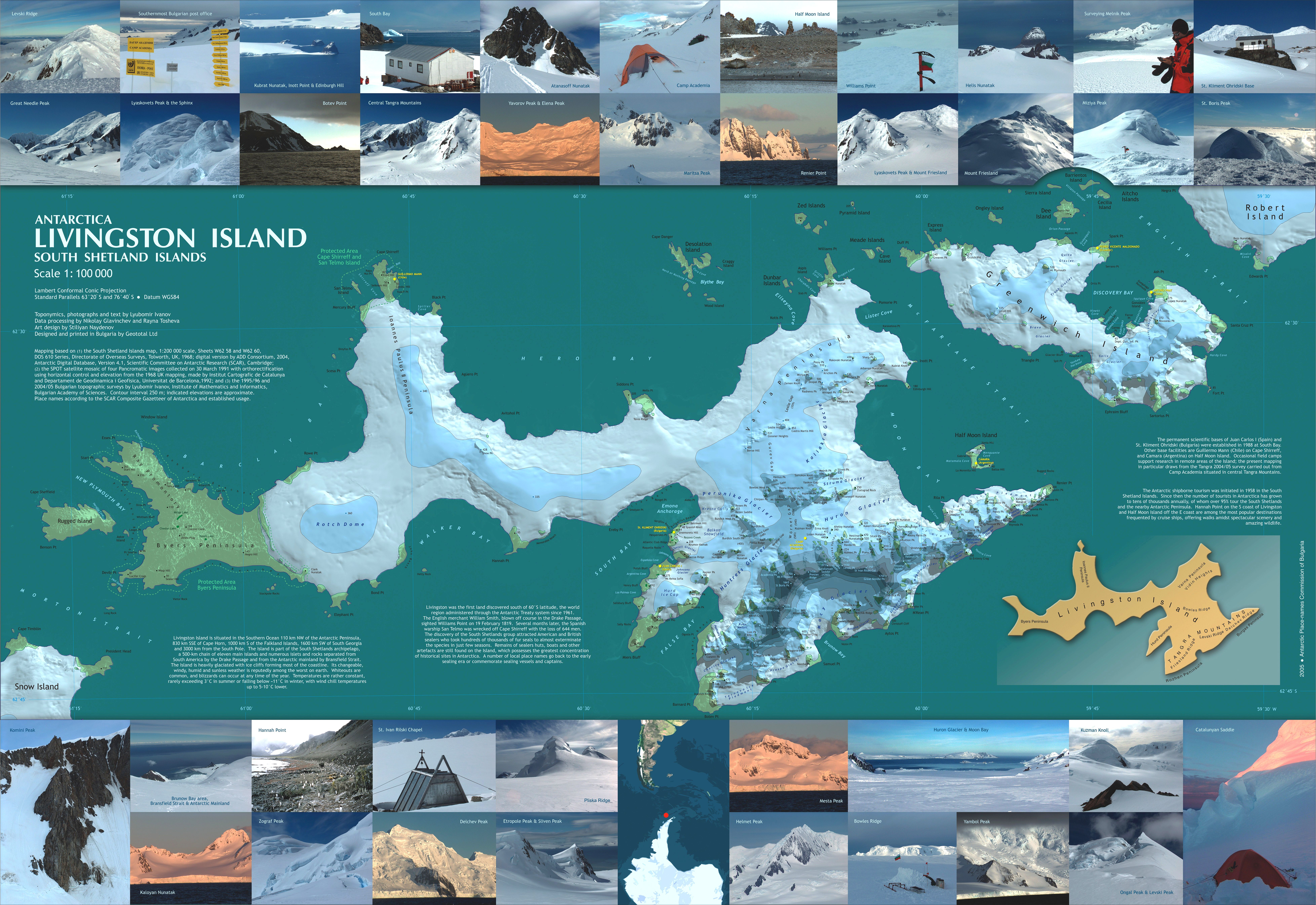
Antarctica: Livingston Island and Greenwich Island, South Shetland Islands

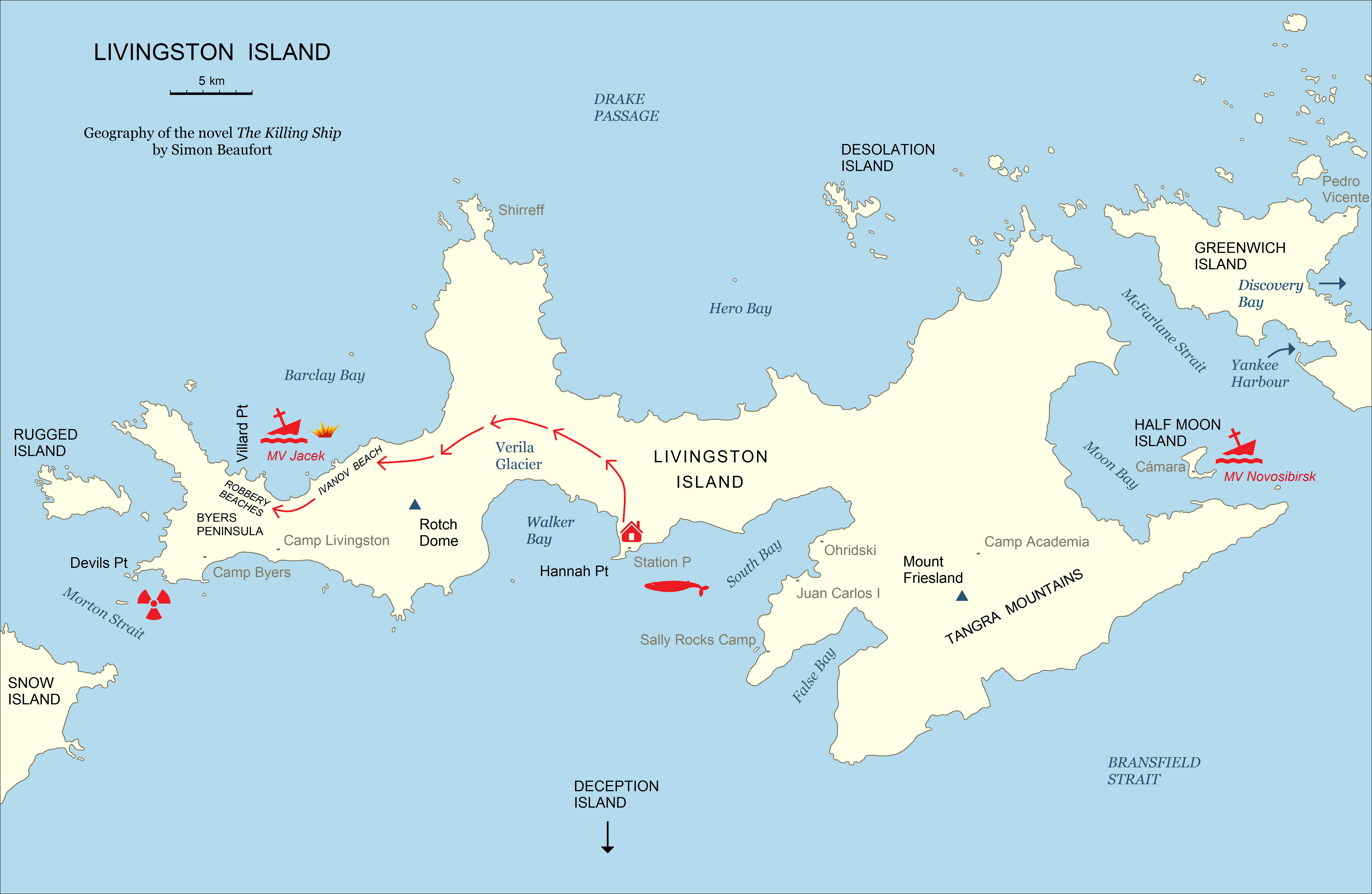
Geography of the thriller novel
The Killing Ship by Simon Beaufort
