= Rotch Dome =

Ice dome in Antarctica

Location of Livingston Island in the South Shetland Islands

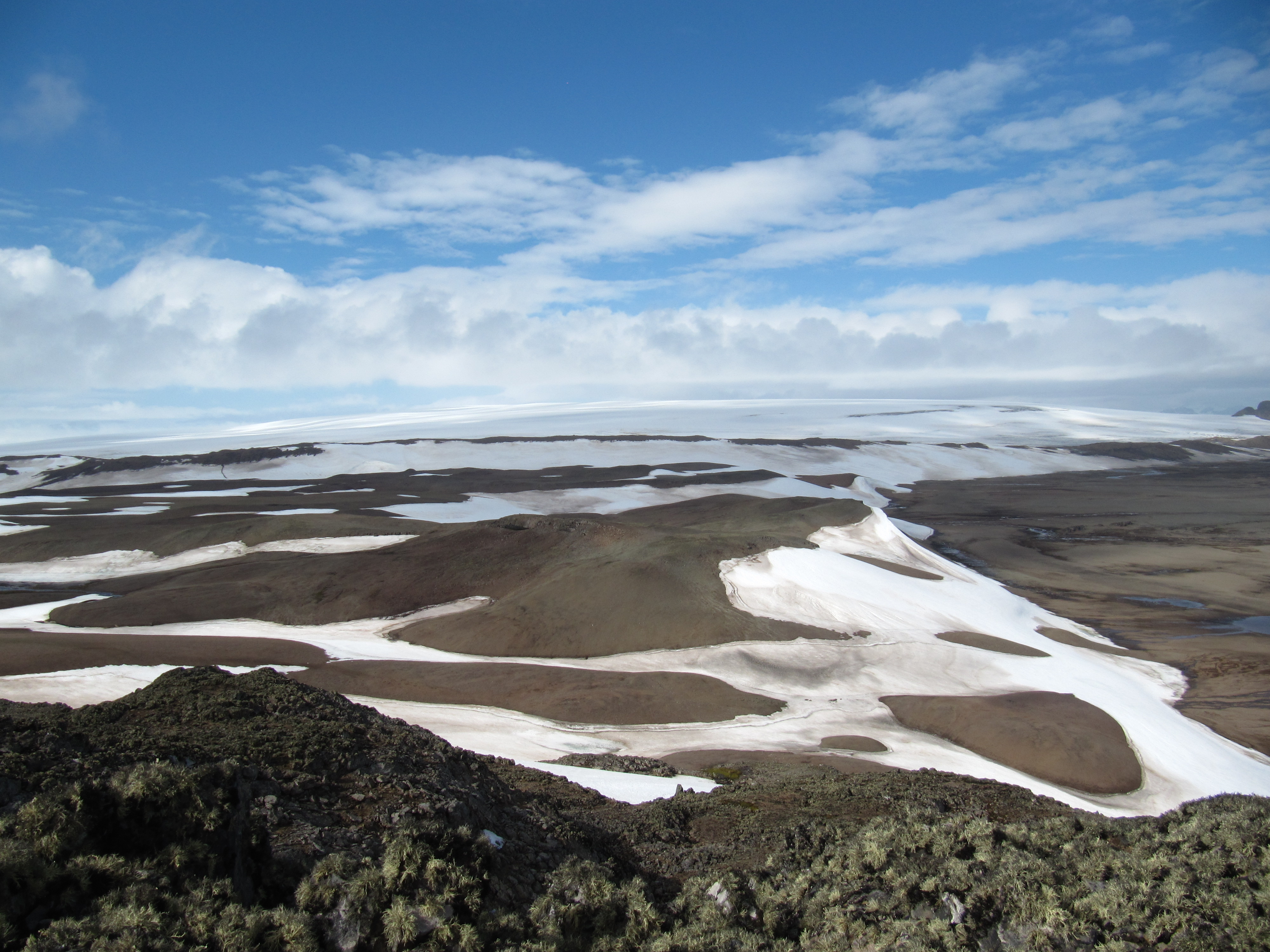
Urvich Wall and Rotch Dome from near Basalt Lake on Byers Peninsula, Livingston Island in Antarctica

Topographic map of Livingston Island and Smith Island

Rotch Dome is the sloping ice dome rising to 360 m immediately east of Byers Peninsula, and between Barclay Bay and Walker Bay in Livingston Island, South Shetland Islands, Antarctica. It is bounded by Urvich Wall to the west, surmounting Ivanov Beach to the northwest, Etar Snowfield to the north-northeast and Verila Glacier to the east-northeast, and is linked by a saddle to Casanovas Peak to the northeast.

The slopes of Rotch Dome west of 60º53'45"W were included in 2016 into the Antarctic Specially Protected Area Byers Peninsula (ASPA 126), with a designated zone comprising the northwestern part of Rotch Dome and the adjacent deglaciated ground on Ivanov Beach placed under greater restriction on access in order to prevent microbial or other contamination by human activity.

== Location ==
The highest point is located at 62°38′00″S 60°52′59″W which is 10.4 km southwest of Casanovas Peak, 6.75 km north by west of Elephant Point, 6.1 km east of Tsamblak Hill, 5.37 km east-southeast of Nedelya Point and 4.77 km south by east of Rowe Point (British mapping in 1968, Bulgarian in 2005, 2009 and 2017).

== Maps ==
- L.L. Ivanov et al. Antarctica: Livingston Island and Greenwich Island, South Shetland Islands. Scale 1:100000 topographic map. Sofia: Antarctic Place-names Commission of Bulgaria, 2005.
- L.L. Ivanov. Antarctica: Livingston Island and Greenwich, Robert, Snow and Smith Islands. Scale 1:120000 topographic map. Troyan: Manfred Wörner Foundation, 2009. ISBN 978-954-92032-6-4
- Antarctic Digital Database (ADD). Scale 1:250000 topographic map of Antarctica. Scientific Committee on Antarctic Research (SCAR). Since 1993, regularly upgraded and updated.
- L.L. Ivanov. Antarctica: Livingston Island and Smith Island. Scale 1:100000 topographic map. Manfred Wörner Foundation, 2017. ISBN 978-619-90008-3-0

== In fiction ==
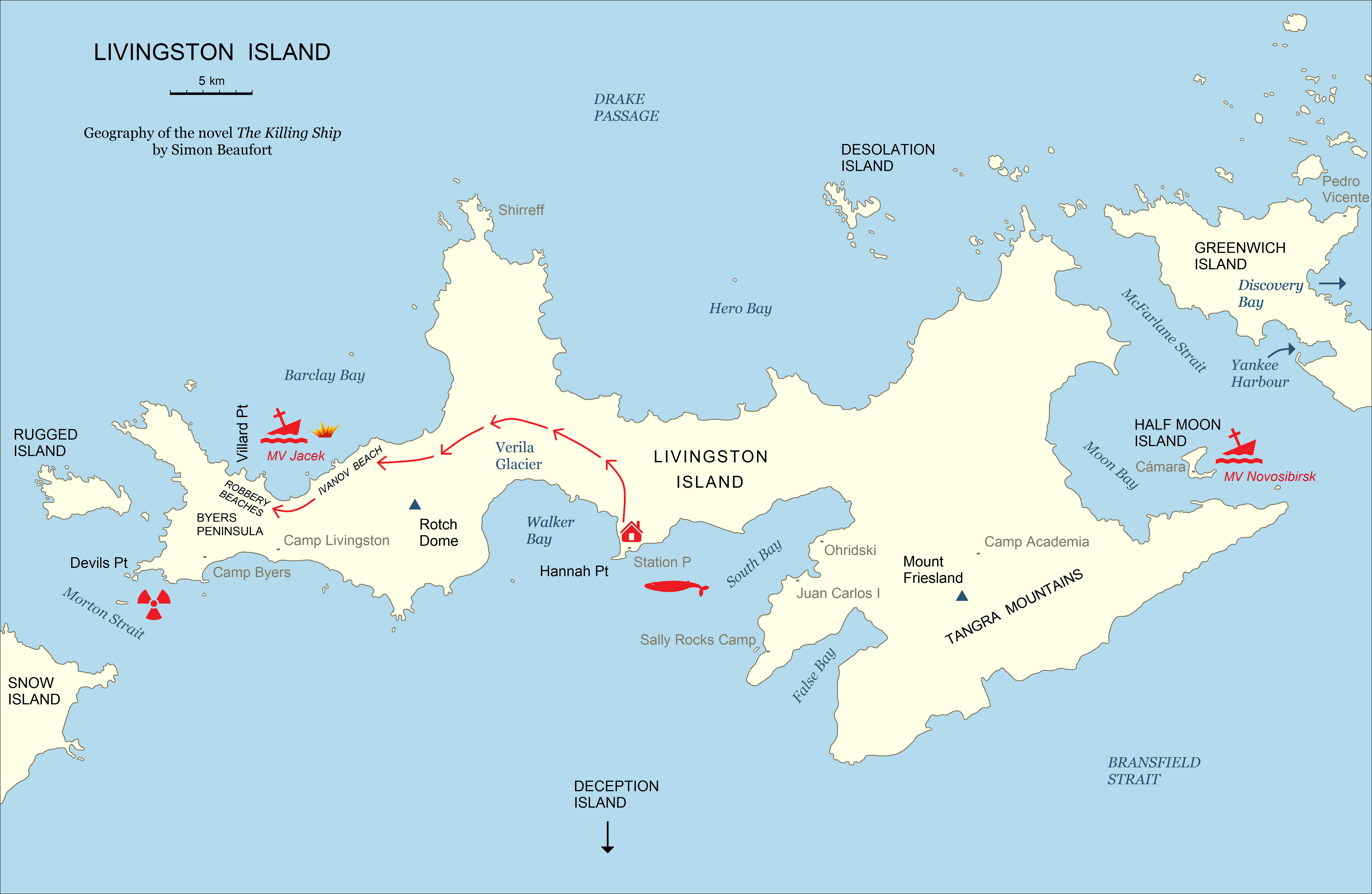
Geography of the thriller novel The Killing Ship by Simon Beaufort

Rotch Dome is part of the mise-en-scène in the 2016 Antarctica thriller novel The Killing Ship by Simon Beaufort, with action spreading westwards from Hannah Point, skirting the dome and eventually reaching Byers Peninsula; the feature is shown on a sketch map of Livingston Island illustrating the book.
