= Susanna Gregory =

Detective fiction author

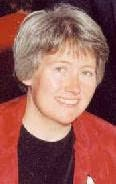
Susanna Gregory

Susanna Gregory is the pseudonym of Elizabeth Cruwys, a Cambridge academic who was previously a coroner's officer. She writes detective fiction, and is noted for her series of mediaeval mysteries featuring Matthew Bartholomew, a teacher of medicine and investigator of murders in 14th-century Cambridge.

== Works ==
Her books may have some aspects in common with the Ellis Peters Cadfael series, the mediaeval adventures of two men, a highly intelligent physician and a Benedictine monk who is senior proctor of Cambridge University. Matthew Bartholomew's activities as a healer, including examination of corpses, embroil him in a series of mysterious crimes, both secular and monastic, and he reluctantly assumes the role of an amateur sleuth. Sceptical of superstition, he is somewhat ahead of his time, and much historical detail is woven into the adventures. But there any resemblance to the comparatively warm-hearted Cadfael series ends: the tone and subject matter of the Gregory novels is darker and does not shrink from portraying the realities of life in the Middle Ages. The first in the series, A Plague on Both Your Houses (1996) is set against the Black Death and subsequent novels take much of their subject matter from the attempts of society to recover from this disaster.

These novels bear the marks of much detailed research into medieval conditions - many of the supporting characters have names taken from the documentation of the time, referenced at the end of each book - and bring vividly to life the squalor of living conditions in England during the Middle Ages. The deep-rooted and pervasive practice of traditional leechcraft as it contrasts with the dawning science of evidence-based medicine is a common bone of contention between Matthew and the students he teaches at Michaelhouse College (now part of Trinity College, Cambridge), whilst the conflict between the students of Cambridge and the townsfolk continually threatens to escalate into violence.

Another series of books, set after the Restoration of Charles II, features Thomas Chaloner, detective and former spy. This series began with A Conspiracy of Violence published in January 2006.

Gregory's short story "To Dispose of an Abbot" was published in the 1998 anthology Past Poisons: An Ellis Peters Memorial Anthology of Historical Crime.

=== Matthew Bartholomew series ===
1. A Plague on Both Your Houses (1996)
2. An Unholy Alliance (1996)
3. A Bone of Contention (1997)
4. A Deadly Brew (1998)
5. A Wicked Deed (1999)
6. A Masterly Murder (2000)
7. An Order for Death (2001)
8. A Summer of Discontent (2002)
9. A Killer in Winter (2003)
10. The Hand of Justice (2004)
11. The Mark of a Murderer (2006)
12. The Tarnished Chalice (2006)
13. To Kill or Cure (2007)
14. The Devil's Disciples (2008)
15. A Vein of Deceit (2009)
16. The Killer of Pilgrims (2010)
17. Mystery in the Minster (2011)
18. Murder by the Book (2012)
19. The Lost Abbot (2013)
20. Death of a Scholar (2014)
21. A Poisonous Plot (2015)
22. A Grave Concern (2016)
23. The Habit of Murder (2017)
24. The Sanctuary Murders (2019)
25. The Chancellor's Secret (2021)

=== Thomas Chaloner series ===
1. A Conspiracy of Violence (2006)
2. Blood On the Strand (2008)
3. The Butcher of Smithfield (2010)
4. The Westminster Poisoner (2010)
5. A Murder on London Bridge (2011)
6. The Body in the Thames (2011)
7. The Piccadilly Plot (2012)
8. Death in St. James's Park (2013)
9. Murder on High Holborn (2014)
10. The Cheapside Corpse (2015)
11. The Chelsea Strangler (2016)
12. The Executioner of St Paul's (2017)
13. Intrigue in Covent Garden (2018)
14. The Clerkenwell Affair (2020)
15. The Pudding Lane Plot: The Fifteenth Thomas Chaloner Adventure (2022)

=== Sir Geoffrey Mappestone ===
Gregory wrote this series of novels about 12th-century knight Geoffrey Mappestone with her husband, Beau Riffenburgh, under the combined pseudonym Simon Beaufort.

1. Murder in the Holy City (1998)
2. A Head for Poisoning (1999)
3. The Bishop’s Brood (2003)
4. The King’s Spies (2003)
5. The Coiners’ Quarrel (2004)
6. Deadly Inheritance (2009)
7. The Bloodstained Throne (2010)
8. A Dead Man’s Secret (2011)

=== Other mystery ===
Under the pseudonym Simon Beaufort.

1. The Murder House (2013)
2. The Killing Ship (2016)
3. Mind of A Killer (2017)
4. The Watchers of the Dead (2019)

== Reviews ==
- A Conspiracy of Violence: Chaloner's First Exploit in Restoration London. Review in Publishers Weekly. New York: May 1, 2006. Vol.253, Iss. 18; p. 41.
- The Tainted Relic (co-authored by Gregory). Review in Publishers Weekly. New York: Oct 31, 2005. Vol. 252, Iss. 43; p. 35
- 'A Plague on Both Your Houses. Review by Rex E Klett. Library Journal. New York: Oct 1, 1998. Vol.123, Iss. 16; p. 139.
- An Unholy Alliance. Review by Brainard, Dulcy. Publishers Weekly. New York: Nov 25, 1996. Vol.243, Iss. 48; p.?.
- A Bone of Contention. Review by Rex E Klett. Library Journal. New York: Dec 1997. Vol.122, Iss. 20; p. 158.
- A Bone of Contention. Review by Dulcy Brainard. Publishers Weekly. New York: Sep 29, 1997. Vol.244, Iss. 40; p. 70.
- An Unholy Alliance. Review by Klett, Rex E. Library Journal. New York: Dec 1996. Vol.121, Iss. 20; p. 150.
- An Unholy Alliance. Review by Brainard, Dulcy. Publishers Weekly. New York: Nov 25, 1996. Vol.243, Iss. 48; p.?
