= Stackpole Rocks =

Group of rocks in Antarctica

Geography
- Location: Antarctica
- Coordinates: 62°40′40.8″S 60°57′26.6″W
- Archipelago: South Shetland Islands

Administration
- Antarctica
- Administered under the Antarctic Treaty System

Demographics
- Population: uninhabited

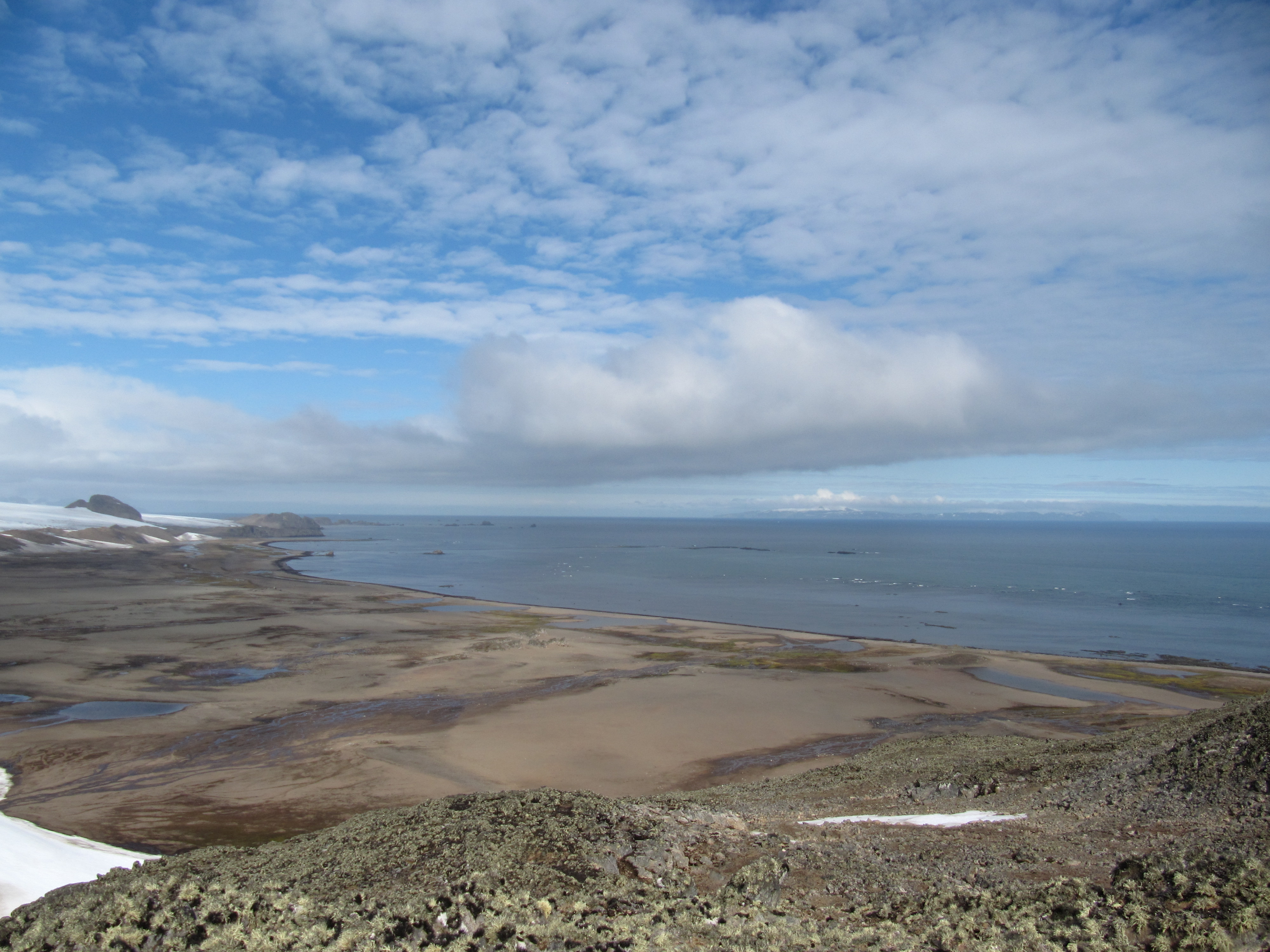
South Beaches from Basalt Lake vicinity on Byers Peninsula, Livingston Island, with Clark Nunatak, Ritli Hill, Elephant Point and Telish Rock in the left background, Stackpole Rocks on the right and Deception Island on the horizon

Topographic map of Livingston Island, Greenwich, Robert, Snow and Smith Islands

Stackpole Rocks is a group of rocks, the largest of them linked by a spit to the east extremity of South Beaches in Byers Peninsula, Livingston Island in the South Shetland Islands, Antarctica. The area was visited by early 19th century sealers.

The feature is named after Edouard Stackpole, Curator of the Marine Historical Association, Mystic, Connecticut, historian of early American whaling and sealing in the South Shetlands.

== Location ==
The rocks are centred at 62°40′40.8″S 60°57′26.6″W which is 6.83 km (4.24 mi) east of Nikopol Point, 3.38 km (2.10 mi) southeast of Dometa Point, 1.4 km (0.87 mi) west-southwest of Rish Point and 5.36 km (3.33 mi) west-northwest of Elephant Point (British mapping in 1968, Chilean in 1971, Argentine in 1980, and Bulgarian in 2009).

== See also ==
- Composite Antarctic Gazetteer
- List of Antarctic islands south of 60° S
- SCAR
- Territorial claims in Antarctica

== Maps ==
- L.L. Ivanov. Antarctica: Livingston Island and Greenwich, Robert, Snow and Smith Islands. Scale 1:120000 topographic map. Troyan: Manfred Wörner Foundation, 2009. ISBN 978-954-92032-6-4
