= Camp Livingston (Antarctica) =

- Antarctic camp
- Location of Camp Livingston in Antarctica
- Coordinates: 62°39′22″S 61°00′39″W
- Country: Argentina
- Location in Antarctica: Livingston Island; South Shetland Islands; Antarctica
- Administered by: Instituto Antártico Argentino
- Established: 1995
- Type: Seasonal
- Period: Summer
- Status: Operational

Location of Byers Peninsula, Livingston Island in the South Shetland Islands.

Topographic map of Livingston Island with the bases and base camps on the island.

Camp Livingston (Spanish: Campamento Livingston, Campamento Científico Livingston) is an Argentine seasonal base camp on Byers Peninsula, Livingston Island in the South Shetland Islands, Antarctica. The area was visited by early 19th century sealers.

== Location ==
The encampment is located at 62°39′22″S 61°00′39″W which is 500 m west-southwest of Negro Hill, 700 m north by east of Dometa Point, 4.63 km east by north of the Spanish Camp Byers and 4.38 km southeast of Chester Cone (detailed Spanish mapping of the area in 1992, Bulgarian mapping in 2005 and 2009).

== See also ==
- List of Antarctic research stations
- List of Antarctic field camps

== Maps ==
- Península Byers, Isla Livingston. Mapa topográfico a escala 1:25000. Madrid: Servicio Geográfico del Ejército, 1992. (Map image on p. 55 of the linked study)
- L.L. Ivanov et al. Antarctica: Livingston Island and Greenwich Island, South Shetland Islands. Scale 1:100000 topographic map. Sofia: Antarctic Place-names Commission of Bulgaria, 2005.
- L.L. Ivanov. Antarctica: Livingston Island and Greenwich, Robert, Snow and Smith Islands. Scale 1:120000 topographic map. Troyan: Manfred Wörner Foundation, 2009. ISBN 978-954-92032-6-4
- Antarctic Digital Database (ADD). Scale 1:250000 topographic map of Antarctica. Scientific Committee on Antarctic Research (SCAR). Since 1993, regularly upgraded and updated.
- L.L. Ivanov. Antarctica: Livingston Island and Smith Island. Scale 1:100000 topographic map. Manfred Wörner Foundation, 2017. ISBN 978-619-90008-3-0
