= Juturna Lake =

Antarctic lake

- Location within South Shetland Islands
- Location: Livingston Island, Antarctica
- Coordinates: 62°40′14″S 60°55′37.5″W
- Lake type: Glacial lake
- Max. length: 220 metres (720 ft)
- Max. width: 150 metres (490 ft)
- Surface area: 1.9 hectares (4.7 acres)

Map of Antarctic Specially Protected Area ASPA 126 Byers Peninsula showing Juturna Lake (unlabeled) near Rish Point

Map of Livingston, Greenwich, Robert, Snow and Smith Islands

Juturna Lake (Bulgarian: езеро Ютурна, romanized: ezero Yuturna, IPA: [ˈɛzɛro juˈturnɐ]) is the roughly triangular lake extending 220 m (720 ft) in west–east direction and 150 m (490 ft) in north–south direction at the east extremity of South Beaches on Byers Peninsula, Livingston Island in the South Shetland Islands, Antarctica. Its surface area is 1.9 ha (4.7 acres). The lake is separated from sea by a to 40-to-57 m-wide (131-to-187 ft) strip of land, and drains by way of a 260 m-long (850 ft) stream flowing into the sea west of Rish Point. It is surmounted by Ritli Hill on the east. The area was visited by early 19th century sealers.

The feature is named after Juturna, a Roman deity of springs and streams, daughter of Volturnus.

== Location ==
Juturna Lake is centred at 62°40′14″S 60°55′37.5″W, which is 320 m (1,050 ft) northeast of Rish Point and 870 m (2,850 ft) southwest of Clark Nunatak. Detailed Spanish mapping in 1992, and Bulgarian mapping in 2009 and 2017.

== Maps ==
- Península Byers, Isla Livingston. Mapa topográfico a escala 1:25000. Madrid: Servicio Geográfico del Ejército, 1992
- L. Ivanov. Antarctica: Livingston Island and Greenwich, Robert, Snow and Smith Islands. Scale 1:120000 topographic map. Troyan: Manfred Wörner Foundation, 2009. ISBN 978-954-92032-6-4
- L. Ivanov. Antarctica: Livingston Island and Smith Island. Scale 1:100000 topographic map. Manfred Wörner Foundation, 2017. ISBN 978-619-90008-3-0
- Antarctic Digital Database (ADD). Scale 1:250000 topographic map of Antarctica. Scientific Committee on Antarctic Research (SCAR). Since 1993, regularly upgraded and updated

== See also ==
- Antarctic lakes
- Livingston Island
