= Wasp Hill =

Location of Byers Peninsula, Livingston Island in the South Shetland Islands

Topographic map of Antarctic Specially Protected Area ASPA 126 Byers Peninsula

Topographic map of Livingston Island and Smith Island

Wasp Hill is a hill rising to 72 meters in the southwest part of Byers Peninsula, Livingston Island in the South Shetland Islands, Antarctica. Surmounting Sevar Point to the south-southwest. The area was visited by 19th century sealers.

The feature is named after the American sealing schooner Wasp under Captain Robert Johnson that visited the South Shetlands in 1821–22.

== Location ==
The hill is located at 62°39′51.9″S 61°07′51.9″W which is 1.01 km northwest of Sealer Hill, 1.4 km northeast of Sevar Point, 2.74 km east-northeast of Devils Point, 1.82 km southeast of Point Smellie, 3.12 km southwest of Usnea Plug and 3.91 km southwest of Chester Cone (British mapping in 1968, detailed Spanish mapping in 1992, and Bulgarian mapping in 2005 and 2009).

== Maps ==
- Península Byers, Isla Livingston. Mapa topográfico a escala 1:25000. Madrid: Servicio Geográfico del Ejército, 1992.
- L.L. Ivanov et al. Antarctica: Livingston Island and Greenwich Island, South Shetland Islands. Scale 1:100000 topographic map. Sofia: Antarctic Place-names Commission of Bulgaria, 2005.
- L.L. Ivanov. Antarctica: Livingston Island and Greenwich, Robert, Snow and Smith Islands. Scale 1:120000 topographic map. Troyan: Manfred Wörner Foundation, 2010. ISBN 978-954-92032-9-5 (First edition 2009. ISBN 978-954-92032-6-4)
- Antarctic Digital Database (ADD). Scale 1:250000 topographic map of Antarctica. Scientific Committee on Antarctic Research (SCAR). Since 1993, regularly updated.
- L.L. Ivanov. Antarctica: Livingston Island and Smith Island. Scale 1:100000 topographic map. Manfred Wörner Foundation, 2017. ISBN 978-619-90008-3-0
