= Dryad Lake =

Antarctic lake

- Location within South Shetland Islands
- Location: Livingston Island, Antarctica
- Coordinates: 62°41′12″S 60°52′06″W
- Lake type: Glacial lake
- Max. length: 190 metres (620 ft)
- Max. width: 90 metres (300 ft)
- Surface area: 1.28 hectares (3.2 acres)

Map of Byers Peninsula featuring Elephant Point

Map of Livingston, Greenwich, Robert, Snow and Smith Islands

Dryad Lake (Bulgarian: езеро Дриада, romanized: ezero Driada, IPA: [ˈɛzɛro driˈadɐ]) is the oval-shaped 190 m long in north-northwest to south-southeast direction and 90 m wide on the southwest coast of Livingston Island in the South Shetland Islands, Antarctica. It has a surface area of 1.28 ha and is separated from sea by a 19 to 25 m wide strip of land. The area was visited by early 19th century sealers.

The feature is named after the Dryads, tree nymphs in Greek mythology.

== Location ==
Dryad Lake is situated on the west side of Elephant Point and centred at 62°41′12″S 60°52′06″W, which is 1.25 km north of Telish Rock, 1.5 km southeast of Amadok Point and 3.25 km west-southwest of Bond Point. Bulgarian mapping of the area in 2009 and 2017.

== Maps ==
- L. Ivanov. Antarctica: Livingston Island and Greenwich, Robert, Snow and Smith Islands. Scale 1:120000 topographic map. Troyan: Manfred Wörner Foundation, 2009. ISBN 978-954-92032-6-4
- L. Ivanov. Antarctica: Livingston Island and Smith Island. Scale 1:100000 topographic map. Manfred Wörner Foundation, 2017. ISBN 978-619-90008-3-0
- Antarctic Digital Database (ADD). Scale 1:250000 topographic map of Antarctica. Scientific Committee on Antarctic Research (SCAR). Since 1993, regularly upgraded and updated

== See also ==
- Antarctic lakes
- Livingston Island
