= Limnopolar Lake =

Lake in the South Shetland Islands, Antarctica

Location of Byers Peninsula on Livingston Island in the South Shetland Islands

Topographic map of Antarctic Specially Protected Area ASPA 126 Byers Peninsula

Topographic map of Livingston Island, Greenwich, Robert, Snow and Smith Islands

Limnopolar Lake is one of the numerous freshwater lakes on the ice-free Byers Peninsula, Livingston Island in the South Shetland Islands, Antarctica. The feature is oval in shape, extending 175 m in southeast-northwest direction and 140 m in southwest-northeast direction. It drains through a 2.7 km stream westwards into Osogovo Bay north of Point Smellie.

The lake's name derives from the extensive limnological research in the area carried out by the Spanish Antarctic programme.

== Location ==
Limnopolar Lake is centred at 62°38′54″S 61°06′18.6″W which is 900 m southwest of Usnea Plug, 2.23 km northeast of Wasp Hill and 2.58 km southeast of Laager Point. British mapping in 1968, detailed Spanish mapping in 1992, and Bulgarian mapping in 2005, 2009 and 2017.

== Map ==
- Península Byers, Isla Livingston. Mapa topográfico a escala 1:25000. Madrid: Servicio Geográfico del Ejército, 1992.
- L. Ivanov et al. Antarctica: Livingston Island and Greenwich Island, South Shetland Islands. Scale 1:100000 topographic map. Sofia: Antarctic Place-names Commission of Bulgaria, 2005.
- L. Ivanov. Antarctica: Livingston Island and Greenwich, Robert, Snow and Smith Islands. Scale 1:120000 topographic map. Troyan: Manfred Wörner Foundation, 2009. ISBN 978-954-92032-6-4
- L. Ivanov. Antarctica: Livingston Island and Smith Island. Scale 1:100000 topographic map. Manfred Wörner Foundation, 2017. ISBN 978-619-90008-3-0
