= Ritli Hill =

Rocky hill in the South Shetland Islands, Antarctica

Location of Livingston Island in the South Shetland Islands

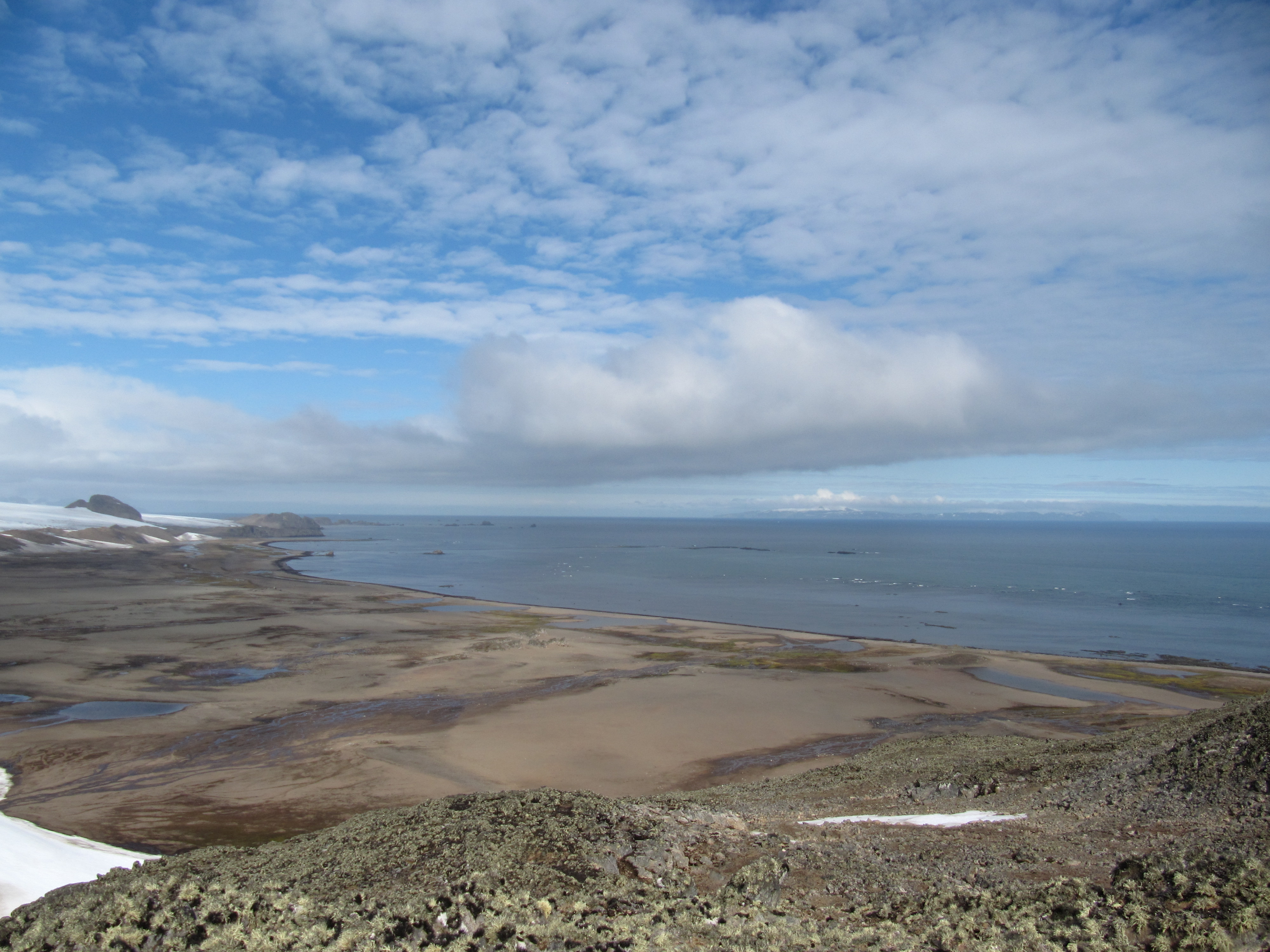
South Beaches from near Basalt Lake on Byers Peninsula, Livingston Island, with Clark Nunatak, Ritli Hill, Elephant Point and Telish Rock in the left background, Stackpole Rocks on the right and Deception Island on the horizon

Topographic map of Antarctic Specially Protected Area ASPA 126 Byers Peninsula

Topographic map of Livingston Island and Smith Island

Ritli Hill (Bulgarian: хълм Ритли, ‘Halm Ritli’ \'h&lm 'rit-li\) is a rocky hill rising to 45 m on the south coast of western Livingston Island in the South Shetland Islands, Antarctica. It surmounts Juturna Lake on the west. The area was visited by early 19th century sealers.

The hill is named after the rock formation of Ritlite in western Bulgaria.

== Location ==
Ritli Hill is located at 62°40′16″S 60°55′06″W, which is 700 m east of Rish Point and 600 m southwest of Clark Nunatak (Spanish mapping in 1993).

== Maps ==
- Península Byers, Isla Livingston. Mapa topográfico a escala 1:25000. Madrid: Servicio Geográfico del Ejército, 1992.
- L.L. Ivanov. Antarctica: Livingston Island and Greenwich, Robert, Snow and Smith Islands. Scale 1:120000 topographic map. Troyan: Manfred Wörner Foundation, 2009. ISBN 978-954-92032-6-4
