= Negro Hill =

Hill on Byers Peninsula, Livingston Island

Location of Byers Peninsula, Livingston Island in the South Shetland Islands

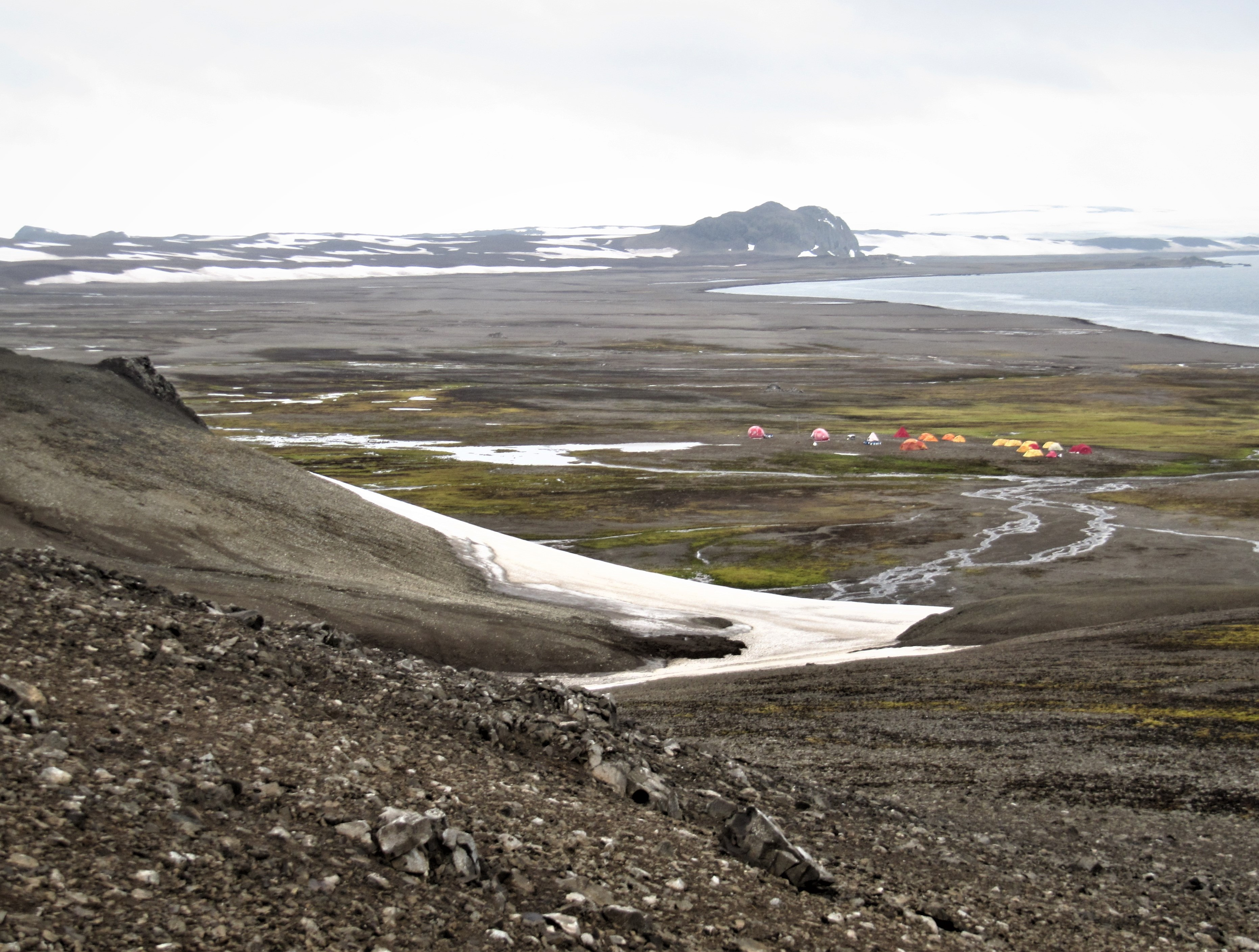
South Beaches on Byers Peninsula, Livingston Island, with Camp Byers in the foreground, and left to right Tsamblak Hill, Negro Hill and Dometa Point in the background

Topographic map of Antarctic Specially Protected Area ASPA 126 Byers Peninsula

Topographic map of Livingston Island, Greenwich, Robert, Snow and Smith Islands

Negro Hill is a conspicuous rocky hill, double-peaked with a small tarn in between, rising to 100 m at South Beaches on Byers Peninsula, Livingston Island in the South Shetland Islands, Antarctica. It surmounts Fontus Lake on the south. The area was visited by 19th-century sealers.

The feature was descriptively named Morro Negro (Spanish for "Black Hill") by an expedition from the Argentine Antarctic Program in about 1959.

== Location ==
Negro Hill is located at 62°39′16.2″S 61°00′06″W, which is 1.1 km northeast of Dometa Point, 4.99 km east-northeast of Nikopol Point, 4.71 km east-southeast of Chester Cone, 1.95 km south of Tsamblak Hill and 4.04 km west-northwest of Rish Point (British mapping in 1968, detailed Spanish mapping in 1992, and Bulgarian mapping in 2005 and 2009).

== Maps ==
- Península Byers, Isla Livingston. Mapa topográfico a escala 1:25000. Madrid: Servicio Geográfico del Ejército, 1992.
- L.L. Ivanov et al. Antarctica: Livingston Island and Greenwich Island, South Shetland Islands. Scale 1:100000 topographic map. Sofia: Antarctic Place-names Commission of Bulgaria, 2005.
- L.L. Ivanov. Antarctica: Livingston Island and Greenwich, Robert, Snow and Smith Islands. Scale 1:120000 topographic map. Troyan: Manfred Wörner Foundation, 2009. ISBN 978-954-92032-6-4
