= Camp Byers =

- Antarctic camp
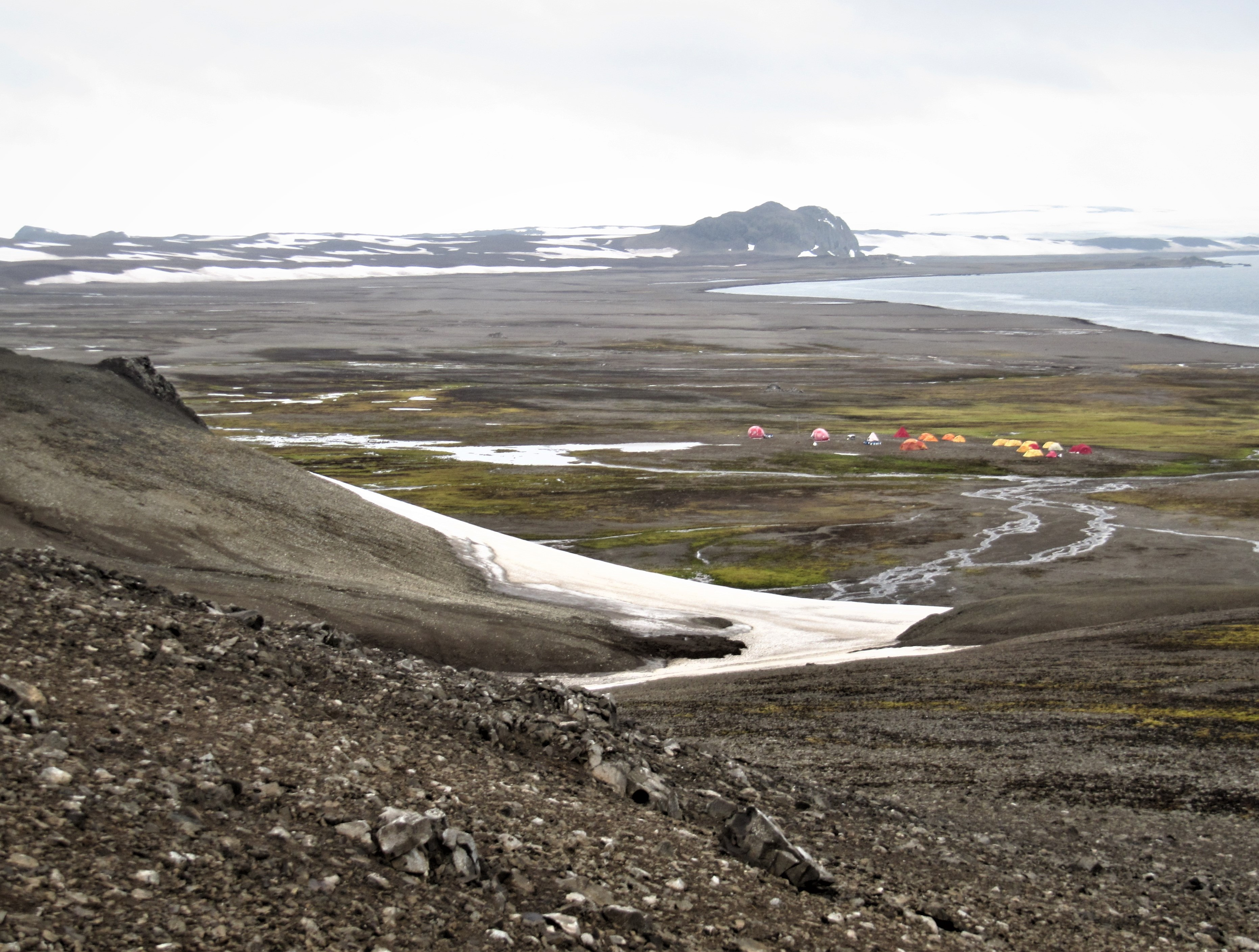
- South Beaches on Byers Peninsula, Livingston Island, with Camp Byers in the foreground, and left to right Tsamblak Hill, Negro Hill and Dometa Point in the background

- Location of Byers Peninsula, Livingston Island in the South Shetland Islands

- Location of Camp Byers in Antarctica
- Coordinates: 62°39′49″S 61°05′58″W
- Country: Spain
- Location in Antarctica: Livingston Island; South Shetland Islands; Antarctica
- Administered by: Spanish National Research Council
- Established: 2001
- Elevation: 10 m (33 ft)

Population (2017)
  - Summer: 12
  - Winter: 0
- Type: Seasonal
- Period: Summer
- Status: Operational

Topographic map of Livingston Island with the bases and base camps on the island including Camp Byers

Camp Byers (Spanish: Campamento Byers) is a Spanish seasonal base camp on Byers Peninsula, Livingston Island in the South Shetland Islands, Antarctica. The locality is also designated for use as an International Field Camp. When necessary for scientific research purposes, temporary camping is allowed elsewhere on the protected peninsula under certain conditions.

The area was visited by early 19th century sealers.

== Location ==
The encampment is 1.2 km north-northwest of Nikopol Point, 1.04 km northeast of Sealer Hill, 3.13 km south by west of Chester Cone and 4.38 km west of Dometa Point (detailed Spanish mapping of the area in 1992, Bulgarian mapping in 2005 and 2009).

== See also ==
- Byers Peninsula
- Livingston Island
- Juan Carlos I Base
- List of Antarctic research stations
- List of Antarctic field camps

== Maps ==
- Península Byers, Isla Livingston. Mapa topográfico a escala 1:25000. Madrid: Servicio Geográfico del Ejército, 1992. (Map image on p. 55 of the linked study)
- L.L. Ivanov et al. Antarctica: Livingston Island and Greenwich Island, South Shetland Islands. Scale 1:100000 topographic map. Sofia: Antarctic Place-names Commission of Bulgaria, 2005.
- L.L. Ivanov. Antarctica: Livingston Island and Greenwich, Robert, Snow and Smith Islands. Scale 1:120000 topographic map. Troyan: Manfred Wörner Foundation, 2009. ISBN 978-954-92032-6-4
- Antarctic Digital Database (ADD). Scale 1:250000 topographic map of Antarctica. Scientific Committee on Antarctic Research (SCAR). Since 1993, regularly upgraded and updated.
- L.L. Ivanov. Antarctica: Livingston Island and Smith Island. Scale 1:100000 topographic map. Manfred Wörner Foundation, 2017. ISBN 978-619-90008-3-0
