= Feya Tarn =

Antarctic tarn

- Location within South Shetland Islands
- Location: Livingston Island, Antarctica
- Coordinates: 62°38′27″S 61°00′44.5″W
- Lake type: Glacial lake
- Primary outflows: Eridanus Stream
- Max. length: 65 metres (213 ft)
- Max. width: 60 metres (200 ft)
- Surface area: 0.28 hectares (0.69 acres)

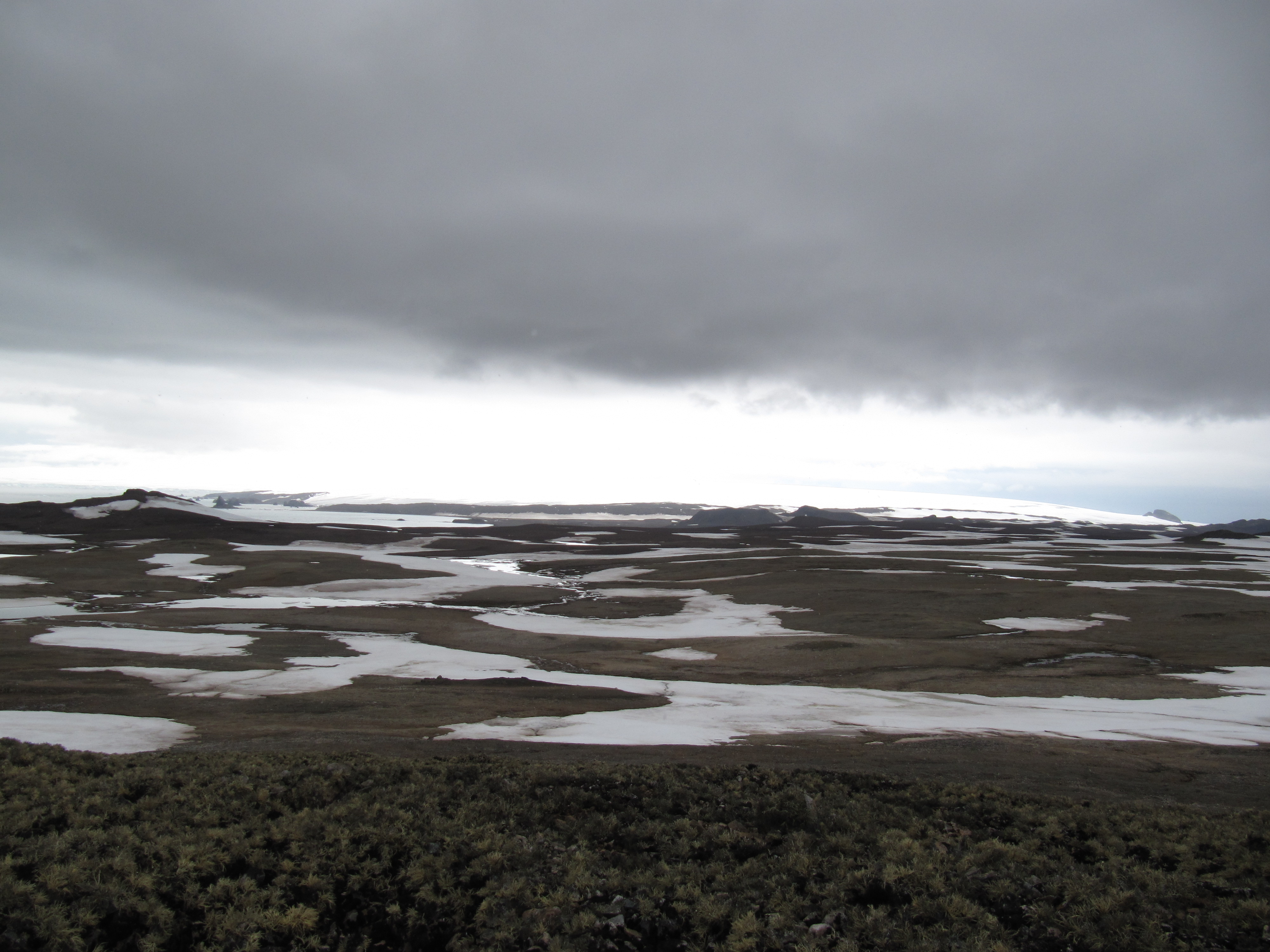
Eastern Byers Peninsula in Livingston Island with Robbery Beaches and Tsamblak Hill in the middle, and left to right Rowe Point, Ivanov Beach, Urvich Wall and Clark Nunatak in the background

Map of Antarctic Specially Protected Area ASPA 126 Byers Peninsula

Map of Livingston, Greenwich, Robert, Snow and Smith Islands

Feya Tarn (Bulgarian: езеро Фея, romanized: ezero Feya, IPA: [ˈɛzɛro ˈfɛjɐ]) is the oval-shaped 65 m long in south–north direction and 60 m wide tarn on eastern Byers Peninsula, Livingston Island in the South Shetland Islands, Antarctica. It has a surface area of 0.28 ha and drains northwards into Barclay Bay by way of Eridanus Stream.

The feature is named after the mythical creatures in European folklore, Feya being the Bulgarian for Fay, Fairy.

== Location ==
Feya Tarn is centred at 62°38′27″S 61°00′44.5″W, which is 3.15 km south-southeast of Lair Point, 1.75 m south-southwest of Sparadok Point and 500 m west-southwest of Tsamblak Hill. Detailed Spanish mapping in 1992, and Bulgarian mapping in 2009 and 2017.

== Maps ==
- Península Byers, Isla Livingston. Mapa topográfico a escala 1:25000. Madrid: Servicio Geográfico del Ejército, 1992
- L. Ivanov. Antarctica: Livingston Island and Greenwich, Robert, Snow and Smith Islands. Scale 1:120000 topographic map. Troyan: Manfred Wörner Foundation, 2009. ISBN 978-954-92032-6-4
- L. Ivanov. Antarctica: Livingston Island and Smith Island. Scale 1:100000 topographic map. Manfred Wörner Foundation, 2017. ISBN 978-619-90008-3-0
- Antarctic Digital Database (ADD). Scale 1:250000 topographic map of Antarctica. Scientific Committee on Antarctic Research (SCAR). Since 1993, regularly upgraded and updated

== See also ==
- Antarctic lakes
- Livingston Island
