= Elephant Point =

Small ice-free promontory

Location of Livingston Island in the South Shetland Islands

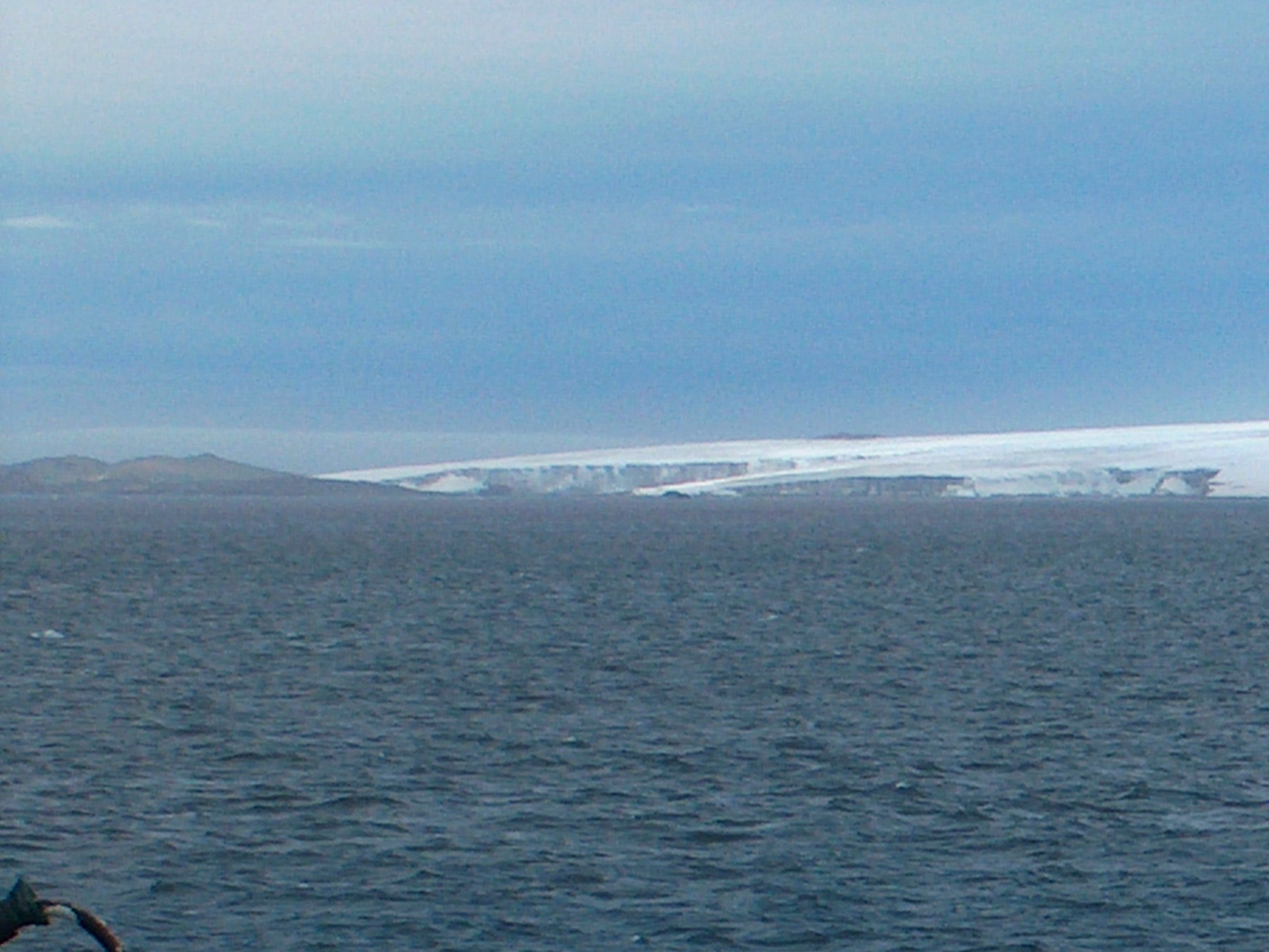
Elephant Point (on the left) from near Hannah Point

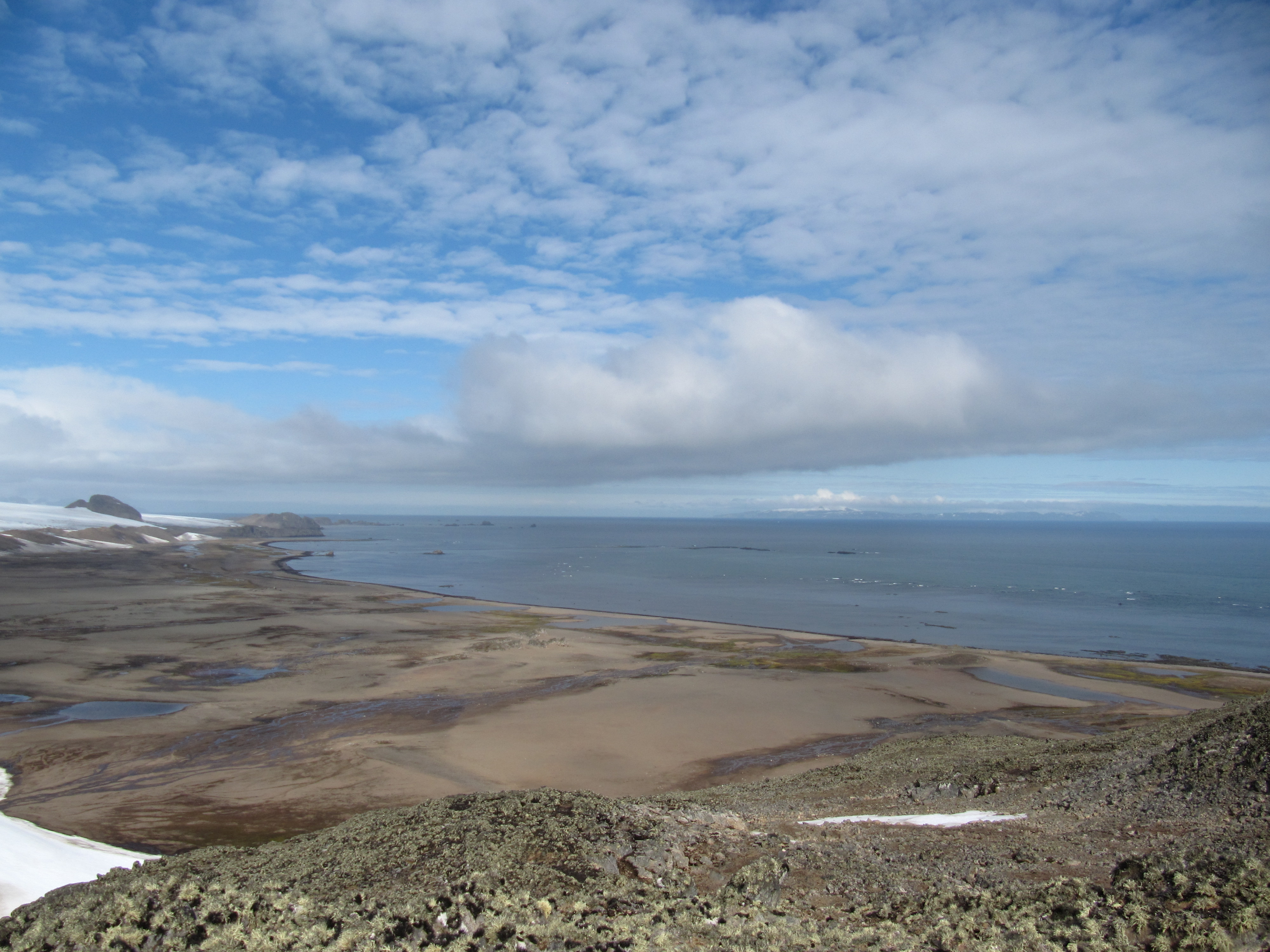
South Beaches from Basalt Lake vicinity on Byers Peninsula, Livingston Island, with Clark Nunatak, Ritli Hill, Elephant Point and Telish Rock in the left background, Stackpole Rocks on the right and Deception Island on the horizon

Topographic map of Livingston Island and Smith Island

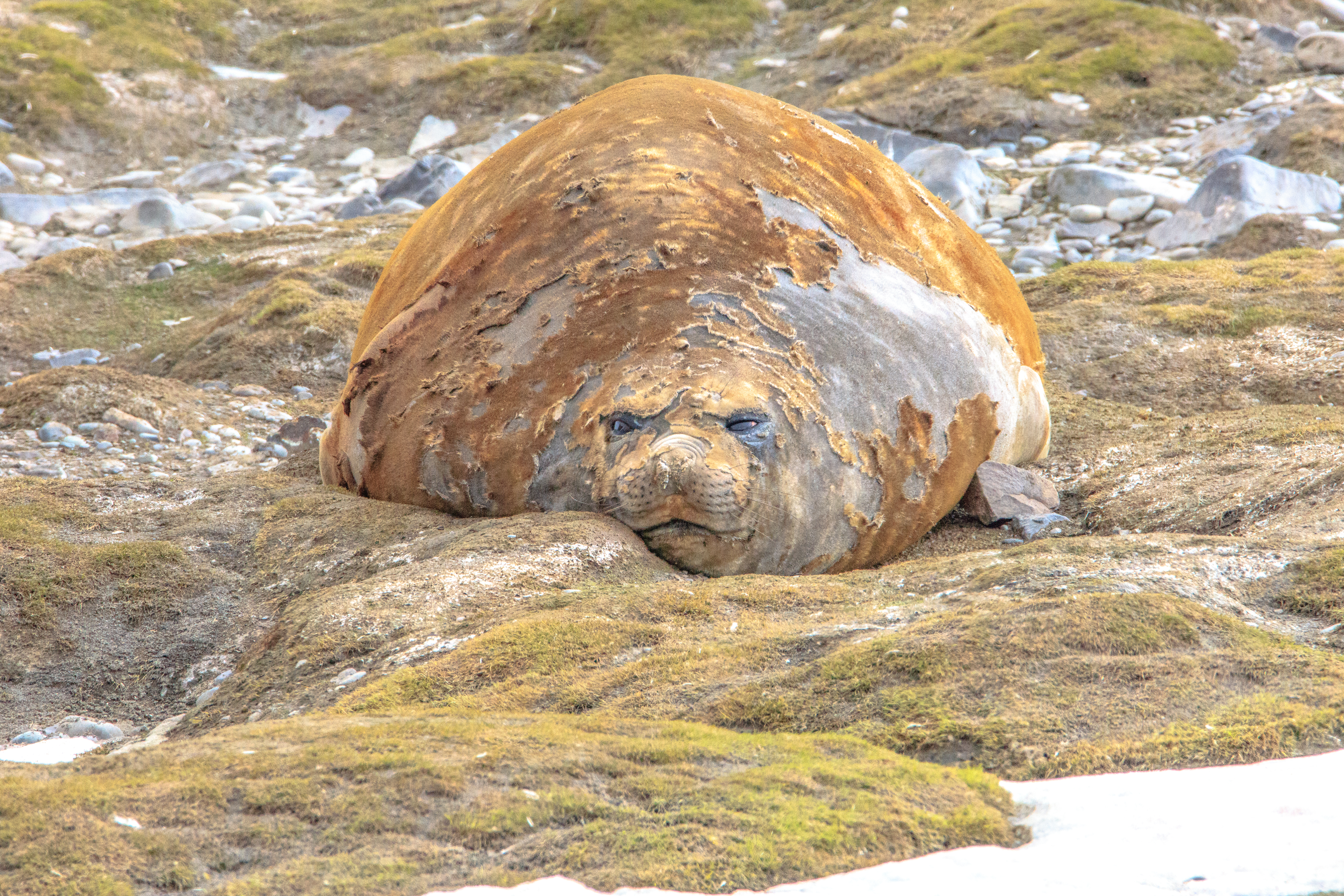
Elephant seal on Antarctic hair-grass at Elephant Point

Elephant Point is a small predominantly ice-free promontory projecting 2 km into Bransfield Strait at the south extremity of the west half of Livingston Island in the South Shetland Islands, Antarctica. The point forms the southwest side of the entrance to Kavarna Cove, and is surmounted by Rotch Dome on the north. Ice-free surface area 109 hectares (270 acres). Dryad Lake is situated on the west side of the point. The area was visited by early 19th century sealers.

The feature is named after the Elephant seal species.

== Location ==
The southernmost point of the feature is located at 62°41′35″S 60°51′28″W which is 12.1 km east-southeast of Nikopol Point, 3.95 km southeast of Clark Nunatak, 3.08 km southwest of Bond Point and 13.2 km west-southwest of Hannah Point. British mapping in 1821 and 1968, Spanish in 1991, and Bulgarian in 2005 and 2009.

== Maps ==
- L.L. Ivanov et al. Antarctica: Livingston Island and Greenwich Island, South Shetland Islands. Scale 1:100000 topographic map. Sofia: Antarctic Place-names Commission of Bulgaria, 2005.
- Antarctic Digital Database (ADD). Scale 1:250000 topographic map of Antarctica. Scientific Committee on Antarctic Research (SCAR). Since 1993, regularly upgraded and updated.
- L.L. Ivanov. Antarctica: Livingston Island and Smith Island. Scale 1:100000 topographic map. Manfred Wörner Foundation, 2017. ISBN 978-619-90008-3-0
