= Eridanus Stream =

Antarctic stream

Location of Byers Peninsula on Livingston Island in the South Shetland Islands

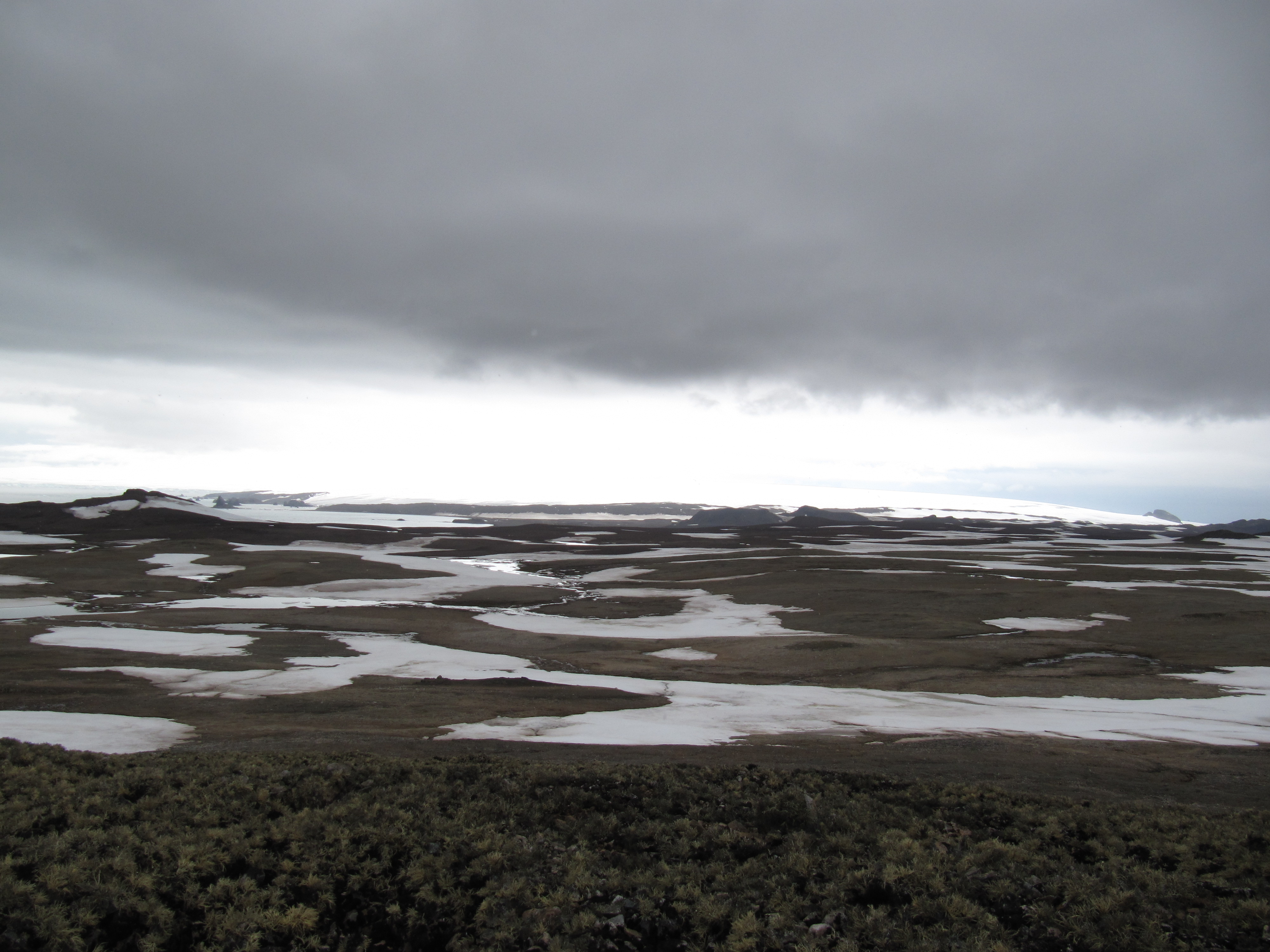
Eastern Byers Peninsula in Livingston Island with Robbery Beaches and Tsamblak Hill in the middle, and left to right Rowe Point, Ivanov Beach, Urvich Wall and Clark Nunatak in the background

Topographic map of Antarctic Specially Protected Area ASPA 126 Byers Peninsula

Topographic map of Livingston, Greenwich, Robert, Snow and Smith Islands

Eridanus Stream (Bulgarian: поток Еридан, romanized: potok Eridan, IPA: [poˈtɔk ˈɛridɐn]) is the 1.65 km long stream on eastern Byers Peninsula, Livingston Island in the South Shetland Islands, Antarctica that drains Feya Tarn, flows northwards along the west side of Tsamblak Hill, crosses Robbery Beaches and empties into Barclay Bay just west of Sparadok Point. The area was visited by early 19th century sealers.

The feature is named after Eridanus River in Greek mythology.

== Location ==
Eridanus Stream is centred at 62°38′04″S 61°00′47.6″W. Detailed Spanish mapping in 1992, and Bulgarian mapping of the area in 2009 and 2017.

== Maps ==
- Península Byers, Isla Livingston. Mapa topográfico a escala 1:25000. Madrid: Servicio Geográfico del Ejército, 1992
- L. Ivanov. Antarctica: Livingston Island and Greenwich, Robert, Snow and Smith Islands. Scale 1:120000 topographic map. Troyan: Manfred Wörner Foundation, 2009. ISBN 978-954-92032-6-4
- L. Ivanov. Antarctica: Livingston Island and Smith Island. Scale 1:100000 topographic map. Manfred Wörner Foundation, 2017. ISBN 978-619-90008-3-0
- Antarctic Digital Database (ADD). Scale 1:250000 topographic map of Antarctica. Scientific Committee on Antarctic Research (SCAR). Since 1993, regularly upgraded and updated

== See also ==
- Livingston Island
