= Volturnus Lake =

Antarctic lake

- Location within South Shetland Islands
- Location: Livingston Island, Antarctica
- Coordinates: 62°40′16.4″S 60°54′48″W
- Lake type: Glacial lake
- Max. length: 225 metres (738 ft)
- Max. width: 215 metres (705 ft)
- Surface area: 3.15 hectares (7.8 acres)

Map of Antarctic Specially Protected Area ASPA 126 Byers Peninsula

Map of Livingston, Greenwich, Robert, Snow and Smith Islands

Volturnus Lake (Bulgarian: езеро Волтурн, romanized: ezero Volturn, IPA: [ˈɛzɛro voɫˈturn]) is the roughly triangular lake extending 225 m in north–south direction and 215 m in east–west direction on the southwest coast of Livingston Island in the South Shetland Islands, Antarctica. Its surface area is 3.15 ha. The area was visited by early 19th century sealers.

The feature is named after Volturnus, a Roman and Etruscan deity of water and rivers.

== Location ==
Volturnus Lake is situated 140 m from the sea and centred at 62°40′16.4″S 60°54′48″W, which is 965 m east of Rish Point, 440 m south of Clark Nunatak and 1.4 km northwest of Amadok Point. Detailed Spanish mapping in 1992, and Bulgarian mapping of the area in 2009 and 2017.

== Maps ==
- Península Byers, Isla Livingston. Mapa topográfico a escala 1:25000. Madrid: Servicio Geográfico del Ejército, 1992
- L. Ivanov. Antarctica: Livingston Island and Greenwich, Robert, Snow and Smith Islands. Scale 1:120000 topographic map. Troyan: Manfred Wörner Foundation, 2009. ISBN 978-954-92032-6-4
- L. Ivanov. Antarctica: Livingston Island and Smith Island. Scale 1:100000 topographic map. Manfred Wörner Foundation, 2017. ISBN 978-619-90008-3-0
- Antarctic Digital Database (ADD). Scale 1:250000 topographic map of Antarctica. Scientific Committee on Antarctic Research (SCAR). Since 1993, regularly upgraded and updated

== See also ==
- Antarctic lakes
- Livingston Island
