= Fontus Lake =

Antarctic lake

- Location within South Shetland Islands
- Location: Livingston Island, Antarctica
- Coordinates: 62°39′40.4″S 61°00′19″W
- Lake type: Glacial lake
- Max. length: 150 metres (490 ft)
- Max. width: 100 metres (330 ft)
- Surface area: 1.9 hectares (4.7 acres)

Map of Antarctic Specially Protected Area ASPA 126 Byers Peninsula featuring Fontus Lake

Map of Livingston, Greenwich, Robert, Snow and Smith Islands

Fontus Lake (Bulgarian: езеро Фонт, romanized: ezero Font, IPA: [ˈɛzɛro ˈfɔnt]) is the oval-shaped 150 m long in south-southwest to north-northeast direction and 100 m wide lake in the middle part of South Beaches on Byers Peninsula, Livingston Island in the South Shetland Islands, Antarctica. It has a surface area of 1.9 ha and is separated from sea by a 53 to 64 m wide strip of land. The area was visited by early 19th century sealers.

The feature is named after Fontus, a Roman deity of springs and streams, son of Juturna.

== Location ==
Fontus Lake is centred at 62°39′40.4″S 61°00′19″W, which is 600 m northeast of Dometa Point and 740 m south of Negro Hill. Detailed Spanish mapping in 1992, and Bulgarian mapping in 2009 and 2017.

== Maps ==
- Península Byers, Isla Livingston. Mapa topográfico a escala 1:25000. Madrid: Servicio Geográfico del Ejército, 1992
- L. Ivanov. Antarctica: Livingston Island and Greenwich, Robert, Snow and Smith Islands. Scale 1:120000 topographic map. Troyan: Manfred Wörner Foundation, 2009. ISBN 978-954-92032-6-4
- L. Ivanov. Antarctica: Livingston Island and Smith Island. Scale 1:100000 topographic map. Manfred Wörner Foundation, 2017. ISBN 978-619-90008-3-0
- Antarctic Digital Database (ADD). Scale 1:250000 topographic map of Antarctica. Scientific Committee on Antarctic Research (SCAR). Since 1993, regularly upgraded and updated

== See also ==
- Antarctic lakes
- Livingston Island
