= Sevar Point =

Location of Byers Peninsula on Livingston Island in the South Shetland Islands

Map of Antarctic Specially Protected Area ASPA 126 Byers Peninsula

Topographic map of Livingston Island and Smith Island

Sevar Point (Bulgarian: нос Севар, ‘Nos Sevar’ \'nos se-'var\) is a point on the south coast of Byers Peninsula on Livingston Island in the South Shetland Islands, Antarctica situated 1.9 km east-southeast of Devils Point, 2.71 km west of Nikopol Point, and 2.97 km northeast of Long Rock in Morton Strait. It is surmounted by Wasp Hill on the north-northeast, Sealer Hill on the east-northeast, and forms the east side of the entrance to Raskuporis Cove.

The point is named after Khan Sevar of Bulgaria, 738-754 AD.

== Location ==
Sevar Point is located at 62°40′32.6″S 61°08′49″W. British mapping in 1968, Spanish in 1992 and Bulgarian in 2009.

== Maps ==
- Península Byers, Isla Livingston. Mapa topográfico a escala 1:25000. Madrid: Servicio Geográfico del Ejército, 1992.
- L.L. Ivanov et al. Antarctica: Livingston Island and Greenwich Island, South Shetland Islands. Scale 1:100000 topographic map. Sofia: Antarctic Place-names Commission of Bulgaria, 2005.
- L.L. Ivanov. Antarctica: Livingston Island and Greenwich, Robert, Snow and Smith Islands. Scale 1:120000 topographic map. Troyan: Manfred Wörner Foundation, 2010. ISBN 978-954-92032-9-5 (First edition 2009. ISBN 978-954-92032-6-4)
- Antarctic Digital Database (ADD). Scale 1:250000 topographic map of Antarctica. Scientific Committee on Antarctic Research (SCAR). Since 1993, regularly updated.
- L.L. Ivanov. Antarctica: Livingston Island and Smith Island. Scale 1:100000 topographic map. Manfred Wörner Foundation, 2017. ISBN 978-619-90008-3-0
