= Vietor Rock =

Rock in the South Shetland Islands, Antarctica

- Location of Byers Peninsula in the South Shetland Islands

- Location on Antarctic Peninsula Location in Antarctica

Geography
- Location: Antarctica
- Coordinates: 62°40′59″S 61°05′53″W
- Archipelago: South Shetland Islands

Administration
- Antarctica
- Administered under the Antarctic Treaty System

Demographics
- Population: uninhabited

Vietor Rock is a rock linked by a spit to Nikopol Point on the south coast of Byers Peninsula, Livingston Island in the South Shetland Islands, Antarctica. The area was visited by early 19th century sealers operating on Byers Peninsula.

The feature is named after Alexander O. Vietor, Curator of Maps, Yale University Library, who discovered the original logbooks of the American sealing vessels Hersilia, 1819–20, and Huron, 1820–21.

== Location ==
The rock is located at 62°40′59″S 61°05′53″W which is 1.2 km (0.75 mi) south-southwest of Nikopol Point, 7.16 km (4.45 mi) northeast of President Head, Snow Island, 5.15 km (3.20 mi) east-northeast of Long Rock and 4.52 km (2.81 mi) east-southeast of Devils Point (British mapping in 1968, Chilean in 1971, Argentine in 1980, detailed Spanish mapping in 1992, and Bulgarian mapping in 2009).

Topographic map of Livingston Island, Greenwich, Robert, Snow and Smith Islands

== See also ==
- Composite Antarctic Gazetteer
- List of Antarctic islands south of 60° S
- SCAR
- Territorial claims in Antarctica

== Maps ==
- Península Byers, Isla Livingston. Mapa topográfico a escala 1:25000. Madrid: Servicio Geográfico del Ejército, 1992.
- L.L. Ivanov. Antarctica: Livingston Island and Greenwich, Robert, Snow and Smith Islands. Scale 1:120000 topographic map. Troyan: Manfred Wörner Foundation, 2009. ISBN 978-954-92032-6-4
