= Telish Rock =

Islet off the south coast of Livingston Island

- Location of on Livingston Island in the South Shetland Islands
- Interactive map of Telish Rock

Geography
- Location: Antarctica
- Coordinates: 62°41′53″S 60°52′08″W
- Archipelago: South Shetland Islands
- Length: 0.3 km (0.19 mi)
- Width: 0.18 km (0.112 mi)

Administration
- Antarctica
- Administered under the Antarctic Treaty System

Demographics
- Population: 0

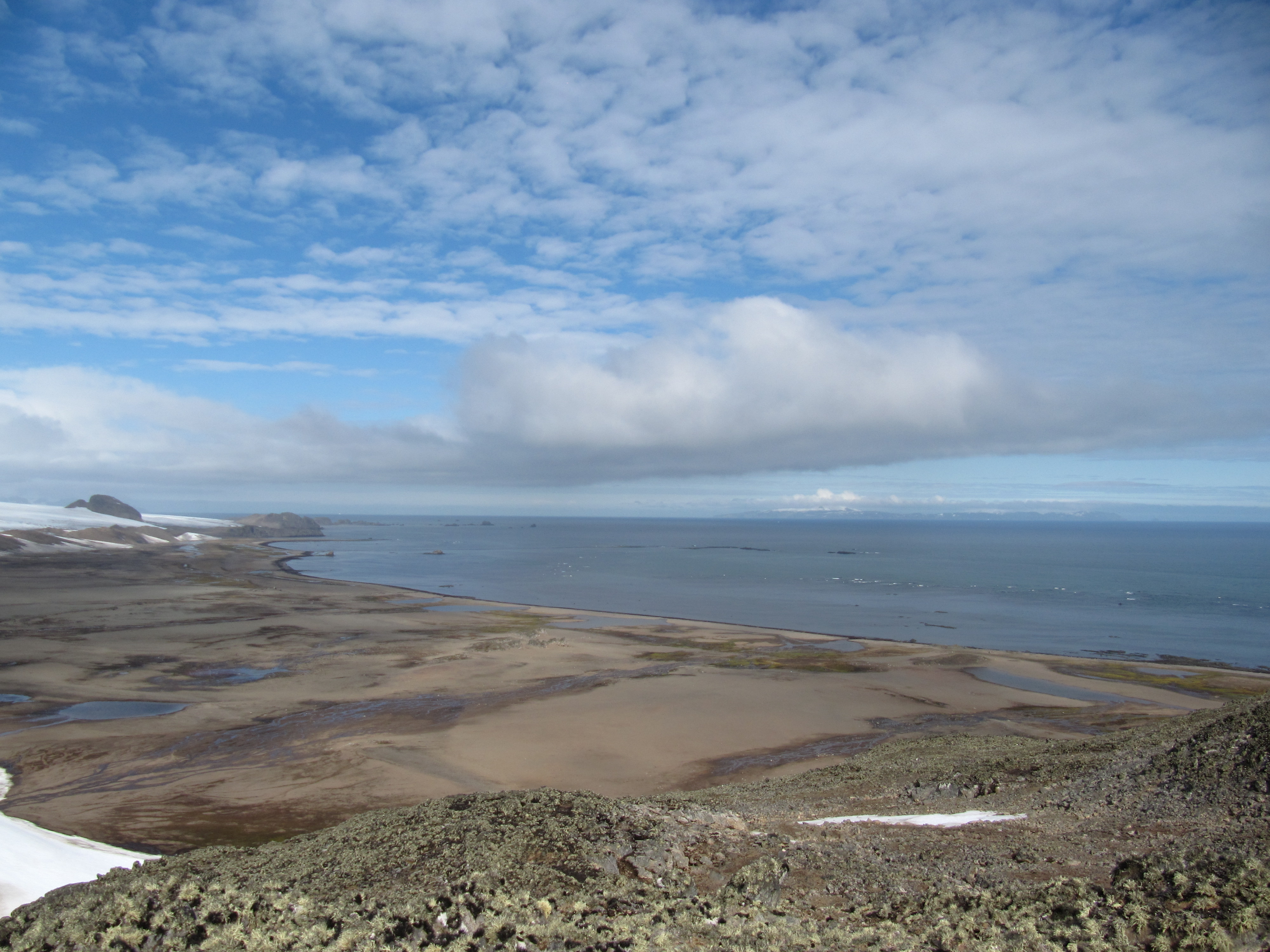
South Beaches from near Basalt Lake on Byers Peninsula, Livingston Island, with Clark Nunatak, Ritli Hill, Elephant Point and Telish Rock in the left background, Stackpole Rocks on the right and Deception Island on the horizon

Topographic map of Livingston Island and Smith Island

Telish Rock (Bulgarian: скала Телиш, ‘Skala Telish’ ska-'la te-'lish) is the islet off the south coast of Livingston Island in the South Shetland Islands, Antarctica situated 400 m (437 yd) south of Elephant Point and 3 km (1.86 mi) northwest by west of Enchantress Rocks. Extending 300 by 180 m (328 by 197 yd). The area was visited by early 19th century sealers.

The islet is named after the settlement of Telish in northern Bulgaria.

== Location ==
Telish Rock is located at 62°41′53″S 60°52′08″W. British mapping in 1968, Chilean in 1971, Argentine in 1980, Spanish in 1993 and Bulgarian in 2005, 2009 and 2010.

== See also ==
- Composite Antarctic Gazetteer
- List of Antarctic islands south of 60° S
- SCAR
- Territorial claims in Antarctica

== Maps ==
- L.L. Ivanov. Antarctica: Livingston Island and Greenwich, Robert, Snow and Smith Islands. Scale 1:120000 topographic map. Troyan: Manfred Wörner Foundation, 2010. ISBN 978-954-92032-9-5 (First edition 2009. ISBN 978-954-92032-6-4)
- Antarctic Digital Database (ADD). Scale 1:250000 topographic map of Antarctica. Scientific Committee on Antarctic Research (SCAR). Since 1993, regularly upgraded and updated.
- L.L. Ivanov. Antarctica: Livingston Island and Smith Island. Scale 1:100000 topographic map. Manfred Wörner Foundation, 2017. ISBN 978-619-90008-3-0
