= Dometa Point =

Headland in the South Shetland Islands, Antarctica

Location of Byers Peninsula on Livingston Island in the South Shetland Islands

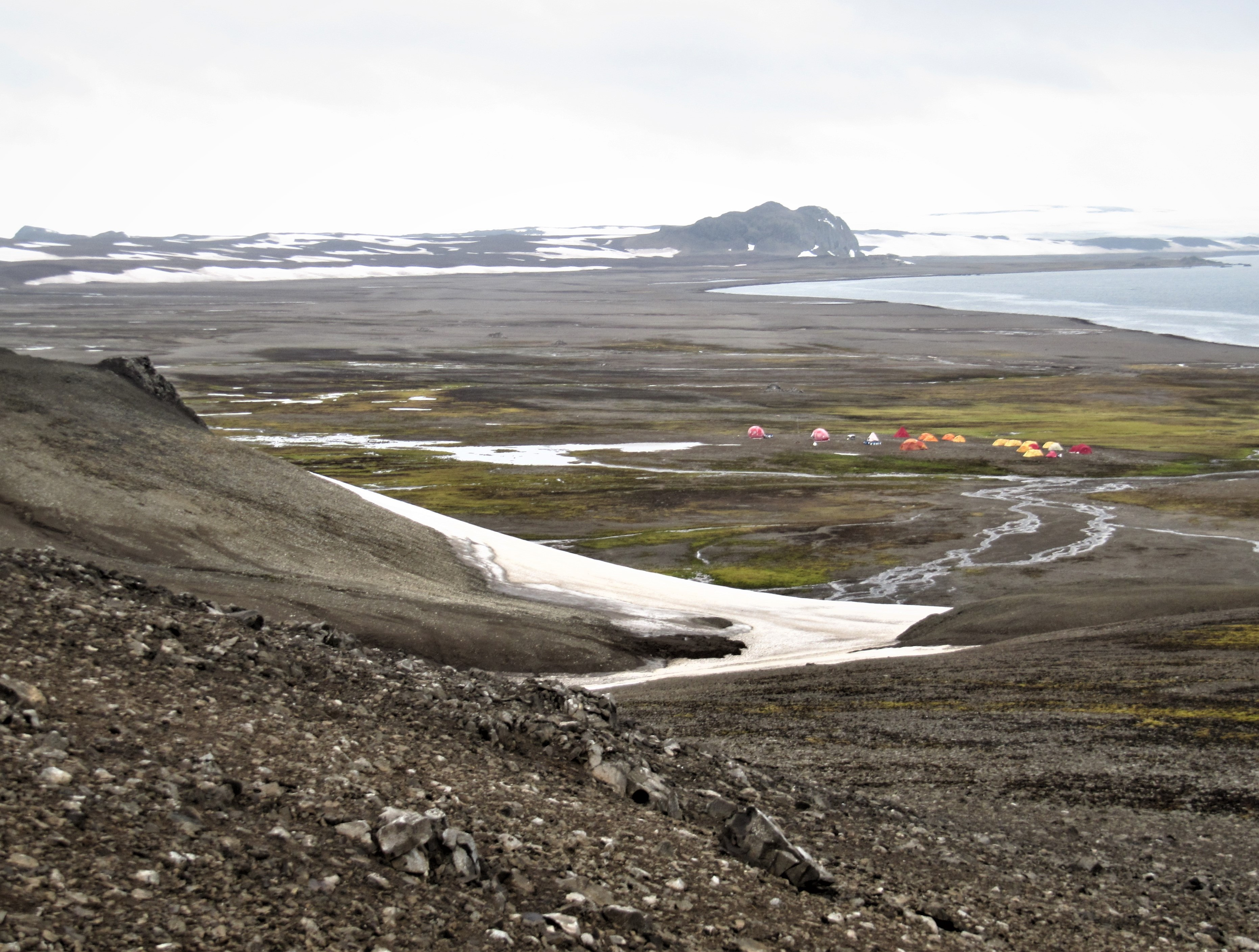
South Beaches on Byers Peninsula, Livingston Island, with Camp Byers in the foreground, and left to right Tsamblak Hill, Negro Hill and Dometa Point in the background

Topographic map of Antarctic Specially Protected Area ASPA 126 Byers Peninsula

Topographic map of Livingston Island and Smith Island

Dometa Point (Bulgarian: нос Домета, ‘Nos Dometa’ \'nos do-'me-ta\) is a point in the middle part of South Beaches on Byers Peninsula, Livingston Island in the South Shetland Islands, Antarctica. It is situated 4.3 km west-northwest of Rish Point, 1.2 km southwest of Negro Hill, 4.6 km southeast of Chester Cone, and 4.2 km east-northeast of Nikopol Point. Fontus Lake is centred 600 m northeast of the point.

The feature is named after Dometa, governor of the southwestern Bulgarian province of Kutmichevitsa hosting the mission of St. Kliment Ohridski assigned by Czar Boris I of Bulgaria (9th Century AD).

== Location ==
Dometa Point is located at 62°39′44″S 61°00′51″W (British mapping in 1968, detailed Spanish mapping in 1992, and Bulgarian mapping in 2005 and 2009).

== Map ==
- Península Byers, Isla Livingston. Mapa topográfico a escala 1:25000. Madrid: Servicio Geográfico del Ejército, 1992.
- L.L. Ivanov et al. Antarctica: Livingston Island and Greenwich Island, South Shetland Islands. Scale 1:100000 topographic map. Sofia: Antarctic Place-names Commission of Bulgaria, 2005.
- L.L. Ivanov. Antarctica: Livingston Island and Greenwich, Robert, Snow and Smith Islands. Scale 1:120000 topographic map. Troyan: Manfred Wörner Foundation, 2010. ISBN 978-954-92032-9-5 (First edition 2009. ISBN 978-954-92032-6-4)
- Antarctic Digital Database (ADD). Scale 1:250000 topographic map of Antarctica. Scientific Committee on Antarctic Research (SCAR). Since 1993, regularly upgraded and updated.
- L.L. Ivanov. Antarctica: Livingston Island and Smith Island. Scale 1:100000 topographic map. Manfred Wörner Foundation, 2017. ISBN 978-619-90008-3-0
