= Tsamblak Hill =

Rocky hill in the South Shetland Islands, Antarctica

Location of Byers Peninsula on Livingston Island in the South Shetland Islands

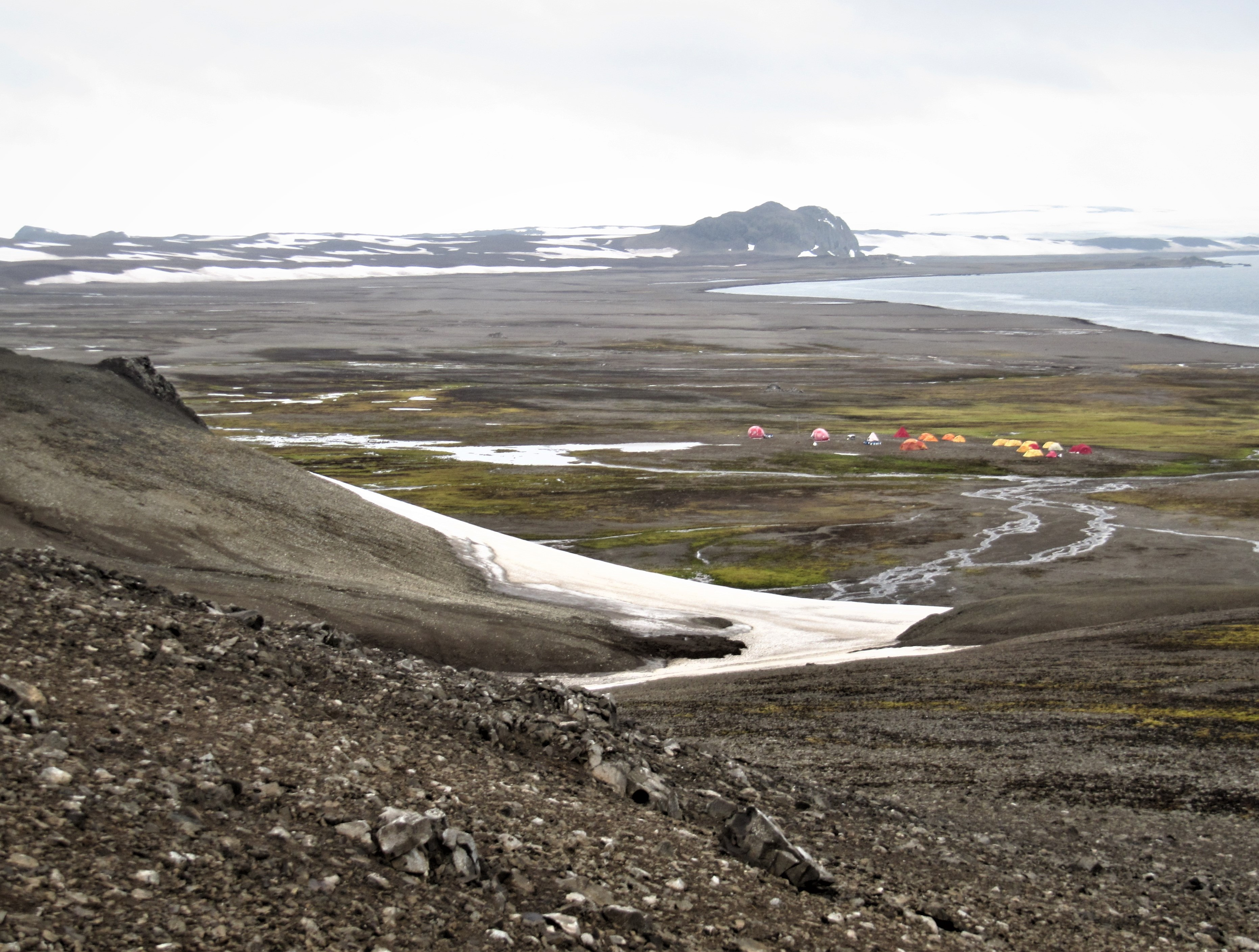
South Beaches on Byers Peninsula, Livingston Island, with Camp Byers in the foreground, and left to right Tsamblak Hill, Negro Hill and Dometa Point in the background

Tsamblak Hill (Bulgarian: хълм Цамблак, ‘Halm Tsamblak’ \'h&lm 'tsam-blak\) is a rocky hill trending 900 m in north–south direction, 450 m wide and rising to 113 m in eastern Byers Peninsula on Livingston Island in the South Shetland Islands, Antarctica. It surmounts Bedek Stream on the east, Feya Tarn on the south-southwest and Eridanus Stream on the west.

The hill is named after the Bulgarian scholar and Metropolitan of Kiev, Grigoriy Tsamblak (1365–1420).

== Location ==
Tsamblak Hill is located at 62°38′20.6″S 61°00′12″W which is 1.73 km north of Negro Hill, 1.45 km south of Sparadok Point, and 4.23 km east of Chester Cone (Spanish mapping in 1992 and Bulgarian in 2009 and 2017).

== Maps ==
- Península Byers, Isla Livingston. Mapa topográfico a escala 1:25000. Madrid: Servicio Geográfico del Ejército, 1992.
- L.L. Ivanov et al. Antarctica: Livingston Island and Greenwich Island, South Shetland Islands. Scale 1:100000 topographic map. Sofia: Antarctic Place-names Commission of Bulgaria, 2005.
- L.L. Ivanov. Antarctica: Livingston Island and Greenwich, Robert, Snow and Smith Islands. Scale 1:120000 topographic map. Troyan: Manfred Wörner Foundation, 2009. ISBN 978-954-92032-6-4 (Second edition 2010, ISBN 978-954-92032-9-5)
- L.L. Ivanov. Antarctica: Livingston Island and Smith Island. Scale 1:100000 topographic map. Manfred Wörner Foundation, 2017. ISBN 978-619-90008-3-0

== Gallery ==
Topographic map of Antarctic Specially Protected Area ASPA 126 Byers Peninsula

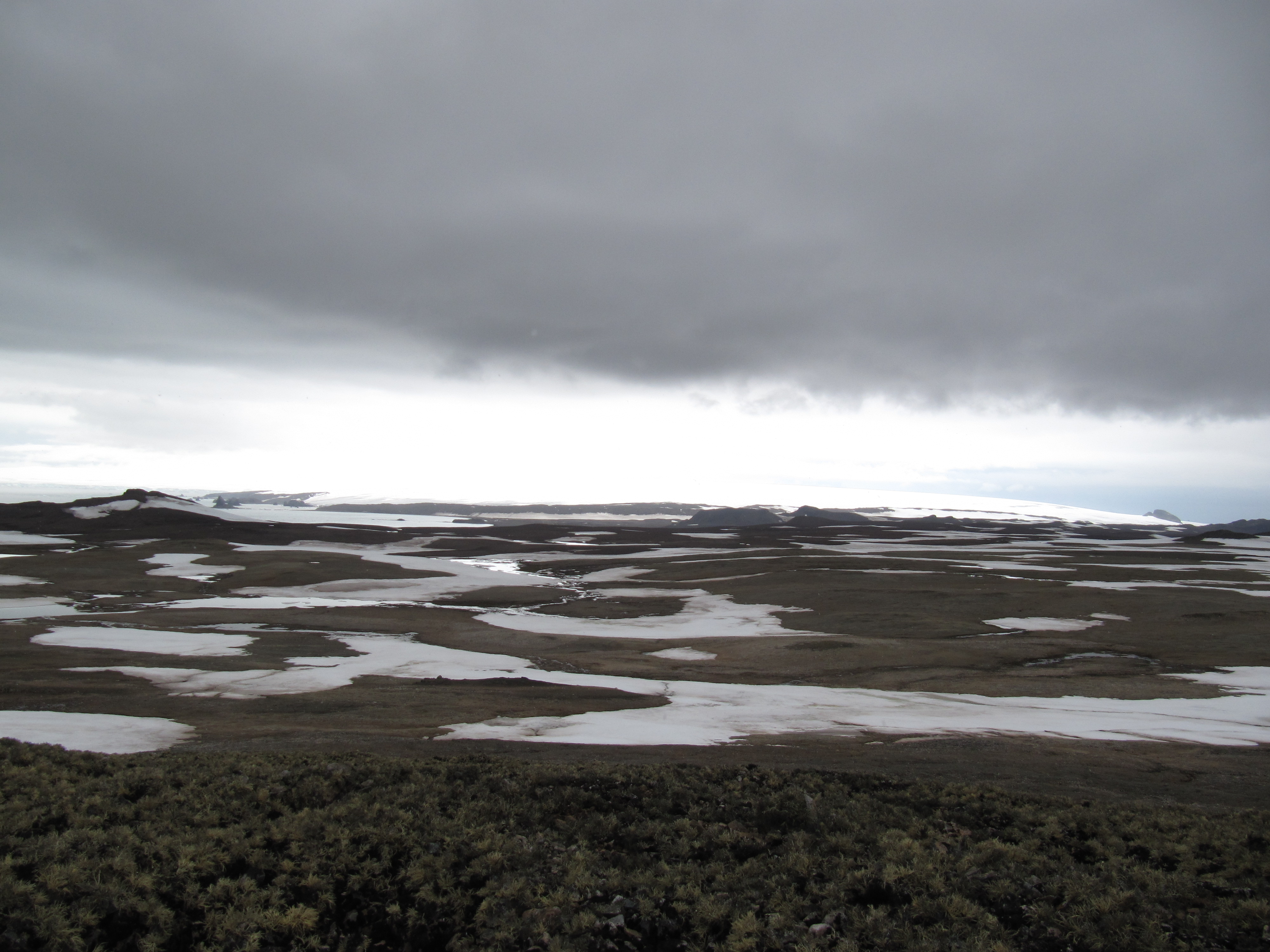
Eastern Byers Peninsula in Livingston Island with left to right Lair Hill, Robbery Beaches, Sparadok Point, Tsamblak Hill and Negro Hill in the middle ground; and Rowe Point, Cutler Stack, Ivanov Beach, Nedelya Point, Urvich Wall surmounted by the slopes of Rotch Dome, and Clark Nunatak in the background

Topographic map of Livingston Island and Smith Island
