= James Byers =

James Byers was an American shipowner, merchant and sealer in New York, originally from Springfield, Massachusetts.

Byers sent a four-vessel sealing fleet to the South Shetland Islands in 1820-21. He also lobbied US Secretary of State John Quincy Adams and President James Monroe to send a warship and take possession of the islands, suggesting that the American sealers were prepared to establish a permanent settlement there.

== Honor ==
Byers Peninsula on Livingston Island in the South Shetland Islands is named after James Byers.
