= Window Island =

Island in Antarctica

- Location of Byers Peninsula on Livingston Island in the South Shetland Islands
- Interactive map of Window Island

Geography
- Location: Antarctica
- Coordinates: 62°33′55.5″S 61°07′25.3″W
- Archipelago: South Shetland Islands
- Area: 23 ha (57 acres)

Administration
- Administered under the Antarctic Treaty System

Demographics
- Population: Uninhabited

Map of Byers Peninsula featuring Window Island

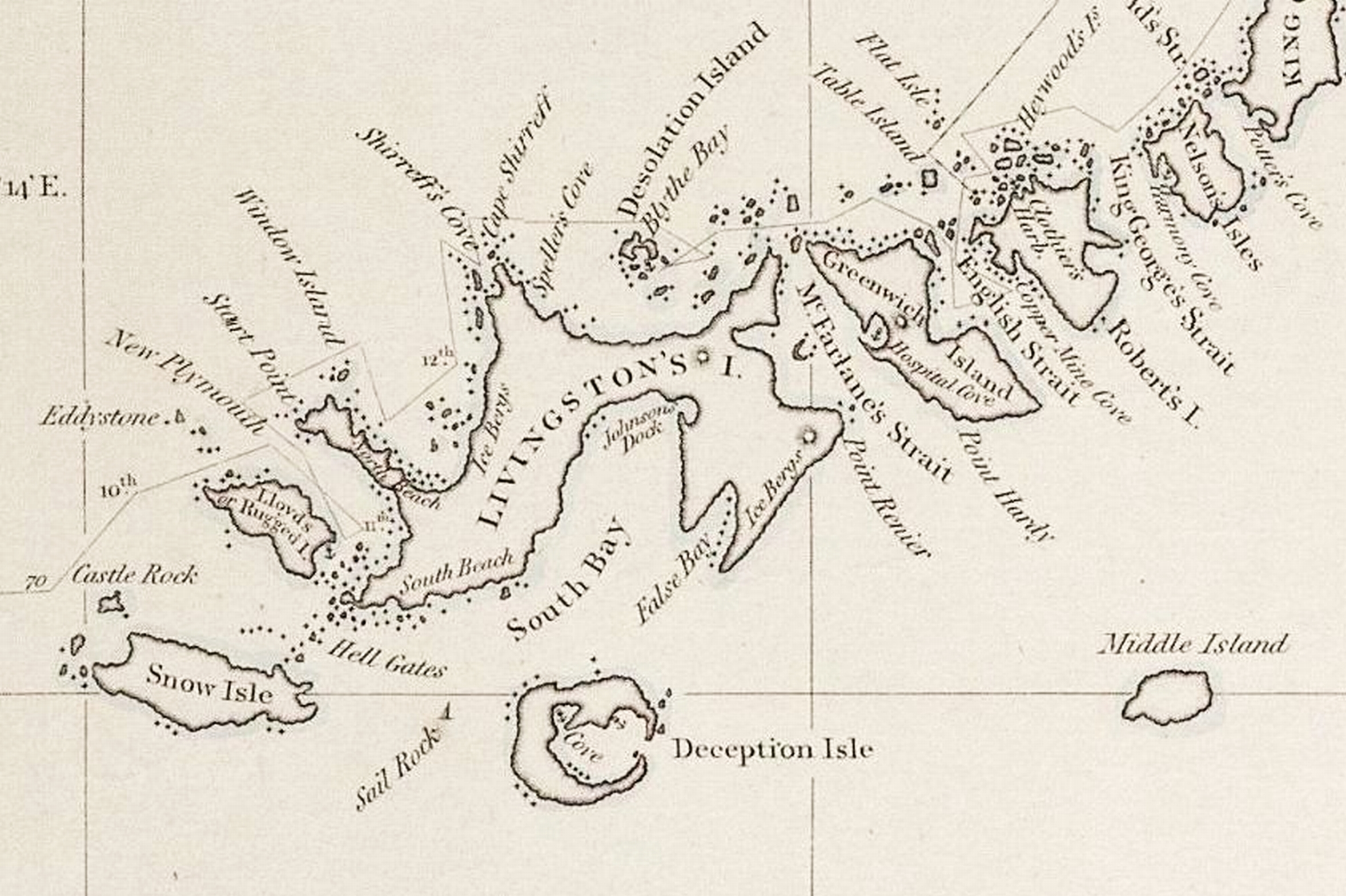
Fragment of George Powell's 1822 chart of the South Shetland Islands and South Orkney Islands featuring Window Island

Topographic map of Livingston and Smith Islands

Window Island is a small ice-free island off the north coast of Ray Promontory in the northwest of Byers Peninsula, Livingston Island in the South Shetland Islands, Antarctica. The island has a surface area of 23 hectares (57 acres) and rises to 72 m (236 ft). It was known to the early 19th century sealers operating on Byers Peninsula.

The feature was charted and descriptively named by Captain George Powell in the British sealing vessel Dove which visited the South Shetlands in 1820–22.

== Location ==
Window Island is located at 62°33′55.5″S 61°07′25.3″W which is 3.32 km (2.06 mi) east-northeast of Essex Point, 1.79 km (1.11 mi) northeast of Voyteh Point, 9.16 km (5.69 mi) northwest of Nedelya Point and 20.9 km (13.0 mi) southwest of Cape Shirreff (British mapping in 1822 and 1968, Chilean in 1971, Spanish in 1861 and 1992, and Bulgarian in 2005 and 2009).

== See also ==
- Composite Antarctic Gazetteer
- List of Antarctic islands south of 60° S
- SCAR
- Territorial claims in Antarctica

== Maps ==
- Chart of South Shetland including Coronation Island, &c. from the exploration of the sloop Dove in the years 1821 and 1822 by George Powell Commander of the same. Scale ca. 1:200000. London: Laurie, 1822.
- Península Byers, Isla Livingston. Mapa topográfico a escala 1:25000. Madrid: Servicio Geográfico del Ejército, 1992.
- South Shetland Islands. Scale 1:200000 topographic map No. 5657. DOS 610 – W 62 60. Tolworth, UK, 1968.
- Islas Livingston y Decepción. Mapa topográfico a escala 1:100000. Madrid: Servicio Geográfico del Ejército, 1991.
- L.L. Ivanov et al. Antarctica: Livingston Island and Greenwich Island, South Shetland Islands. Scale 1:100000 topographic map. Sofia: Antarctic Place-names Commission of Bulgaria, 2005.
- L.L. Ivanov. Antarctica: Livingston Island and Greenwich, Robert, Snow and Smith Islands. Scale 1:120000 topographic map. Troyan: Manfred Wörner Foundation, 2009. ISBN 978-954-92032-6-4
- Antarctic Digital Database (ADD). Scale 1:250000 topographic map of Antarctica. Scientific Committee on Antarctic Research (SCAR). Since 1993, regularly updated.
- L.L. Ivanov. Antarctica: Livingston Island and Smith Island. Scale 1:100000 topographic map. Manfred Wörner Foundation, 2017. ISBN 978-619-90008-3-0
