= Sealer Hill =

Hill with sealers' huts in Antarctica

Location of Byers Peninsula, Livingston Island in the South Shetland Islands

Topographic map of Antarctic Specially Protected Area ASPA 126 Byers Peninsula

Topographic map of Livingston Island, Greenwich, Robert, Snow and Smith Islands

Sealer Hill is a hill rising to 70 m in the southwest part of Byers Peninsula, Livingston Island in the South Shetland Islands, Antarctica. It surmounts Nikopol Point and Sevar Point to the east-southeast and west-southwest, respectively. The area was inhabited by 19th century sealers.

The feature was so named following geological work by BAS in 1975–76, from the presence of at least three crude stone huts built by sealers below the hill.

== Location ==
The hill is located at 62°40′09.7″S 61°06′52.1″W, which is 1.28 km west-northwest of Nikopol Point, 1.83 km east-northeast of Sevar Point, 3.49 km east by north of Devils Point, 2.8 km southeast of Point Smellie, 4.07 km southwest of Basalt Lake and 3.96 km south-southwest of Chester Cone (British mapping in 1968, detailed Spanish mapping in 1992, and Bulgarian mapping in 2005 and 2009).

== Maps ==
- Península Byers, Isla Livingston. Mapa topográfico a escala 1:25000. Madrid: Servicio Geográfico del Ejército, 1992.
- L.L. Ivanov et al. Antarctica: Livingston Island and Greenwich Island, South Shetland Islands. Scale 1:100000 topographic map. Sofia: Antarctic Place-names Commission of Bulgaria, 2005.
- L.L. Ivanov. Antarctica: Livingston Island and Greenwich, Robert, Snow and Smith Islands. Scale 1:120000 topographic map. Troyan: Manfred Wörner Foundation, 2009. ISBN 978-954-92032-6-4
