= Volturnalia =

Ancient Roman festival

Volturnalia was the Roman festival on August 27 dedicated to Volturnus, 'god of the waters,' god of fountains. Volturnus was a tribal river god who later was identified as god of the Tiber river. The Volturno River, in southern Italy, is named for him. Volturnus was the father of the goddess Juturna, who was first identified with a spring in Latium near the Numicus River and later with a pool near the Temple of Vesta in the Forum of Rome. They were both honored on this day with feasting, wine-drinking, and games.
