= Alexander O. Vietor =

American map scholar

Alexander Orr Vietor (1913 – March 9, 1981) was an American authority on marine Americana and maps. A graduate of Yale in the class of 1936, he served as curator of maps at Yale University from 1943 to 1978. He was a member of the board of the New-York Historical Society and of the Acorn Club, to which he was elected in 1953.

He married Anna Glen Butler; and they had four daughters and three sons.

== See also ==
- Vietor Rock
