= Point Smellie =

Small steep-sided headland in the South Shetland Islands, Antarctica

Location of Byers Peninsula, Livingston Island in the South Shetland Islands

Topographic map of Antarctic Specially Protected Area ASPA 126 Byers Peninsula

Topographic map of Livingston Island and Smith Island

Point Smellie is a small steep-sided headland extending into Osogovo Bay from President Beaches on Byers Peninsula, Livingston Island in the South Shetland Islands, Antarctica and dominated by Smellie Hill (46 m).

The feature is named after John Smellie, BAS geologist who worked in the area in 1975–76.

== Location ==
The point is located at 62°39′06″S 61°09′11.9″W which is 7.7 km south-southeast of Start Point, 3.89 km southwest of Chester Cone, 3.98 km northwest of Nikopol Point, 2.63 km north-northeast of Devils Point and 2.86 km southeast of Radev Point, Rugged Island (British mapping in 1968, detailed Spanish mapping in 1992, and Bulgarian mapping in 2005 and 2009).

== Maps ==
- South Shetland Islands. Scale 1:200000 topographic map. DOS 610 Sheet W 62 60. Tolworth, UK, 1968.
- Península Byers, Isla Livingston. Mapa topográfico a escala 1:25000. Madrid: Servicio Geográfico del Ejército, 1992.
- L.L. Ivanov et al. Antarctica: Livingston Island and Greenwich Island, South Shetland Islands. Scale 1:100000 topographic map. Sofia: Antarctic Place-names Commission of Bulgaria, 2005.
- L.L. Ivanov. Antarctica: Livingston Island and Greenwich, Robert, Snow and Smith Islands. Scale 1:120000 topographic map. Troyan: Manfred Wörner Foundation, 2009. ISBN 978-954-92032-6-4
- Antarctic Digital Database (ADD). Scale 1:250000 topographic map of Antarctica. Scientific Committee on Antarctic Research (SCAR). Since 1993, regularly updated.
- L.L. Ivanov. Antarctica: Livingston Island and Smith Island. Scale 1:100000 topographic map. Manfred Wörner Foundation, 2017. ISBN 978-619-90008-3-0
