= Usnea Plug =

Antarctic geological formation

Location of Byers Peninsula, Livingston Island in the South Shetland Islands

Topographic map of Antarctic Specially Protected Area ASPA 126 Byers Peninsula

Topographic map of Livingston Island, Greenwich, Robert, Snow and Smith Islands

Usnea Plug is a volcanic plug, 30 m from base to summit, rising to 117 m in the interior of Byers Peninsula, Livingston Island in the South Shetland Islands, Antarctica. The area was known to 19th century sealers.

The feature's name derives from the genus of lichen, Usnea, prevalent on the plug and in this vicinity, and results from geological work by an American field party in early 1969.

== Location ==
The hill is located at 62°38′30″S 61°05′43.1″W which is 790 m southwest of Chester Cone, 3.47 km north of Nikopol Point, 5.54 km northeast of Devils Point and 2.77 km east by south of Laager Point (British mapping in 1968, detailed Spanish mapping in 1992, and Bulgarian mapping in 2005 and 2009).

== Maps ==
- Península Byers, Isla Livingston. Mapa topográfico a escala 1:25000. Madrid: Servicio Geográfico del Ejército, 1992.
- L.L. Ivanov et al. Antarctica: Livingston Island and Greenwich Island, South Shetland Islands. Scale 1:100000 topographic map. Sofia: Antarctic Place-names Commission of Bulgaria, 2005.
- L.L. Ivanov. Antarctica: Livingston Island and Greenwich, Robert, Snow and Smith Islands. Scale 1:120000 topographic map. Troyan: Manfred Wörner Foundation, 2009. ISBN 978-954-92032-6-4
