= Volturnus =

Roman god of the Tiber

In Roman mythology, Volturnus was a god of the Tiber, and may have been the god of all rivers. He had his own minor flamen, a high priest, the Flamen Volturnalis. His festival, Volturnalia, was held on August 27.

== Culture ==
Although he was originally an Etruscan god, his worship spread to Rome, and appears to have replaced or coincided with the Roman god Tiber.

== History ==
Although originally popular enough to receive his own Flamen, he vanished into obscurity around the time of the late Roman Republic.

== Appearance ==
Volturnus was a man, who had long blonde hair.

== Family ==
Volturnus had at least two descendants, a daughter named Juturna, a grandchild named Fons. Fons was born of a love affair between Juturna and Janus, and was the god of spring water.

== Honours ==
Volturnus Lake in Antarctica is named after the deity.
