= Rish Point =

Ice-free point in the South Shetland Islands, Antarctica

Location of Byers Peninsula on Livingston Island in the South Shetland Islands

Topographic map of Antarctic Specially Protected Area ASPA 126 Byers Peninsula

Topographic map of Livingston Island and Smith Island

Rish Point (Bulgarian: нос Риш, ‘Nos Rish’ \'nos 'rish\) is an ice-free point projecting 300 m from the south coast of Livingston Island in the South Shetland Islands, Antarctica. It is situated at the east extremity of South Beaches, Byers Peninsula, 2.3 km northwest of Amadok Point, 1.3 km southwest of Clark Nunatak, and 1 km northeast of Stackpole Rocks. Juturna Lake is centred 320 m northeast of the point.

The feature is named after the settlement of Rish in the eastern Balkan Mountains, Bulgaria.

== Location ==
Rish Point is located at 62°40′21″S 60°55′55″W. British mapping in 1968, Spanish in 1993, and Bulgarian in 2005 and 2009.

== Map ==
- L.L. Ivanov. Antarctica: Livingston Island and Greenwich, Robert, Snow and Smith Islands. Scale 1:120000 topographic map. Troyan: Manfred Wörner Foundation, 2009. ISBN 978-954-92032-6-4
