= Amadok Point =

Point on the south coast of Livingston Island, Antarctica

Location of Livingston Island in the South Shetland Islands.

Topographic map of Livingston Island and Smith Island.

Amadok Point Nos Amadok Point (nos a-ma-'dok) is a point on the south coast of Livingston Island, Antarctica projecting 400 m into the Bransfield Strait. The point was named after the Thracian King Amadokos, 415-384 BC, and is snow-free in the summer.

== Location ==
Amadok Point is located at 62°40′45″S 60°53′22″W, 2 km northwest of Elephant Point and 1.8 km southeast of Clark Nunatak.

== See also ==
- Livingston Island
- List of Bulgarian toponyms in Antarctica
- Antarctic Place-names Commission

== Maps ==
- Península Byers, Isla Livingston. Mapa topográfico a escala 1:25000. Madrid: Servicio Geográfico del Ejército, 1992.
- L.L. Ivanov et al. Antarctica: Livingston Island and Greenwich Island, South Shetland Islands. Scale 1:100000 topographic map. Sofia: Antarctic Place-names Commission of Bulgaria, 2005.
- L.L. Ivanov. Antarctica: Livingston Island and Greenwich, Robert, Snow and Smith Islands. Scale 1:120000 topographic map. Troyan: Manfred Wörner Foundation, 2009. ISBN 978-954-92032-6-4 (Second edition 2010, ISBN 978-954-92032-9-5)
- Antarctic Digital Database (ADD). Scale 1:250000 topographic map of Antarctica. Scientific Committee on Antarctic Research (SCAR). Since 1993, regularly upgraded and updated.
- L.L. Ivanov. Antarctica: Livingston Island and Smith Island. Scale 1:100000 topographic map. Manfred Wörner Foundation, 2017. ISBN 978-619-90008-3-0
