= Basalt Lake =

Small freshwater lake in Antarctica

- Location within South Shetland Islands
- Location: Livingston Island in the South Shetland Islands, Antarctica
- Coordinates: 62°38′35″S 61°03′33.7″W
- Type: lake

Location of Byers Peninsula on Livingston Island in the South Shetland Islands

Topographic map of Antarctic Specially Protected Area ASPA 126 Byers Peninsula

Topographic map of Livingston Island, Greenwich, Robert, Snow and Smith Islands

Basalt Lake is a small freshwater lake surrounded by three basalt outcrops with ‘organ-pipe’ formations in their rocks, situated in the central part of the ice-free Byers Peninsula, Livingston Island in the South Shetland Islands, Antarctica. and draining through a 1.6 kilometres (0.99 mi) stream southwards into Bransfield Strait.

The feature is descriptively named from the surrounding rock formations.

== Location ==
Basalt Lake is centred at 62°38′35″S 61°03′33.7″W which is 4.07 kilometres (2.53 mi) northeast of Sealer Hill, 1.85 kilometres (1.15 mi) east of Usnea Plug, 1.5 kilometres (0.93 mi) east-southeast of Chester Cone, 3.02 kilometres (1.88 mi) west-southwest of Tsamblak Hill and 3.22 kilometres (2.00 mi) west-northwest from Negro Hill (British mapping in 1968, detailed Spanish mapping in 1992, and Bulgarian mapping in 2005 and 2009).

== Map ==
- Península Byers, Isla Livingston. Mapa topográfico a escala 1:25000. Madrid: Servicio Geográfico del Ejército, 1992.
- L.L. Ivanov et al. Antarctica: Livingston Island and Greenwich Island, South Shetland Islands. Scale 1:100000 topographic map. Sofia: Antarctic Place-names Commission of Bulgaria, 2005.
- L.L. Ivanov. Antarctica: Livingston Island and Greenwich, Robert, Snow and Smith Islands. Scale 1:120000 topographic map. Troyan: Manfred Wörner Foundation, 2009. ISBN 978-954-92032-6-4
