= Clark Nunatak =

Rocky peak in western Livingston Island, South Shetland Islands, Antarctica

Location of Livingston Island in the South Shetland Islands

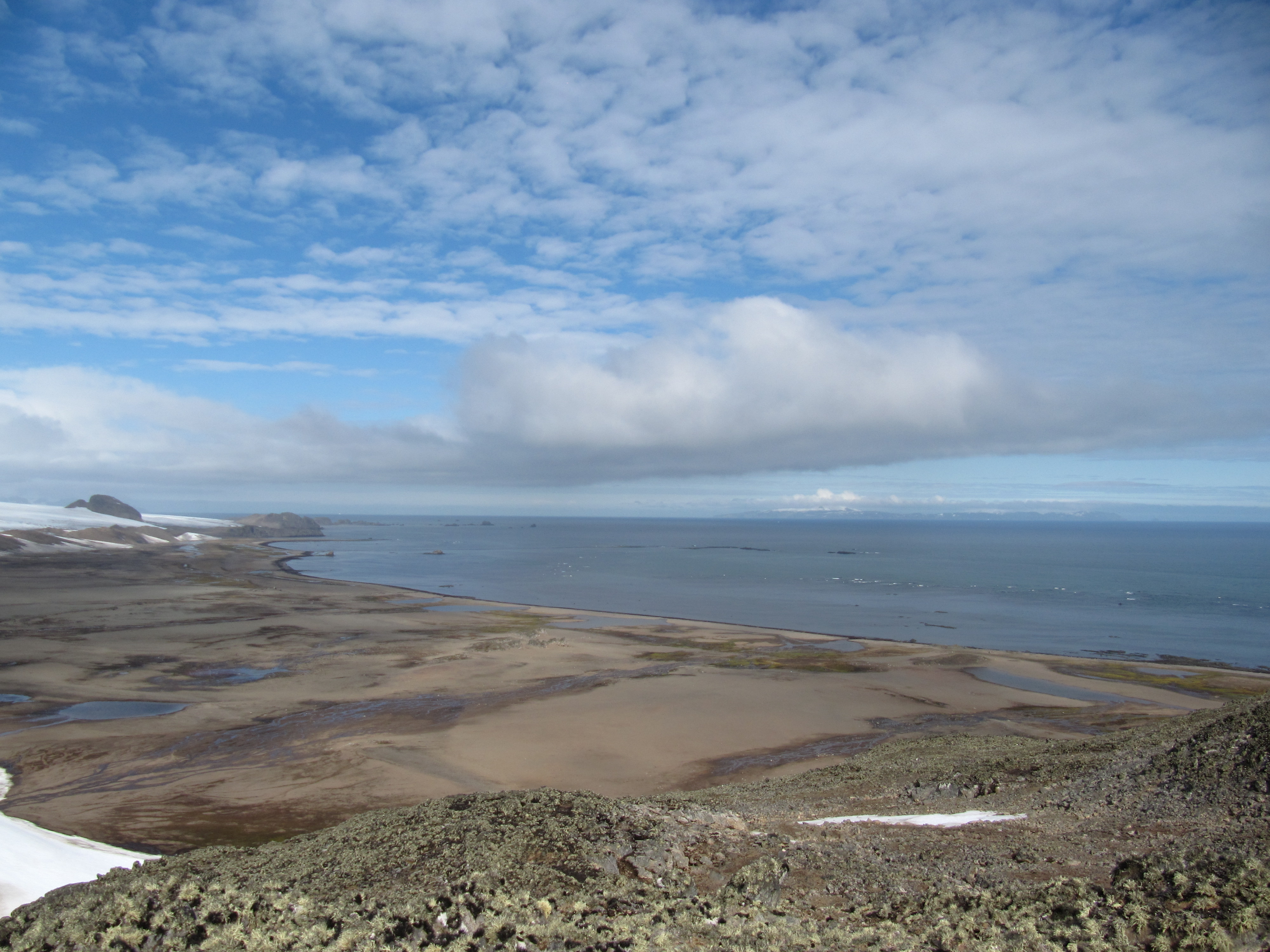
South Beaches from Basalt Lake vicinity on Byers Peninsula, Livingston Island, with Clark Nunatak, Ritli Hill, Elephant Point and Telish Rock in the left background, Stackpole Rocks on the right and Deception Island on the horizon

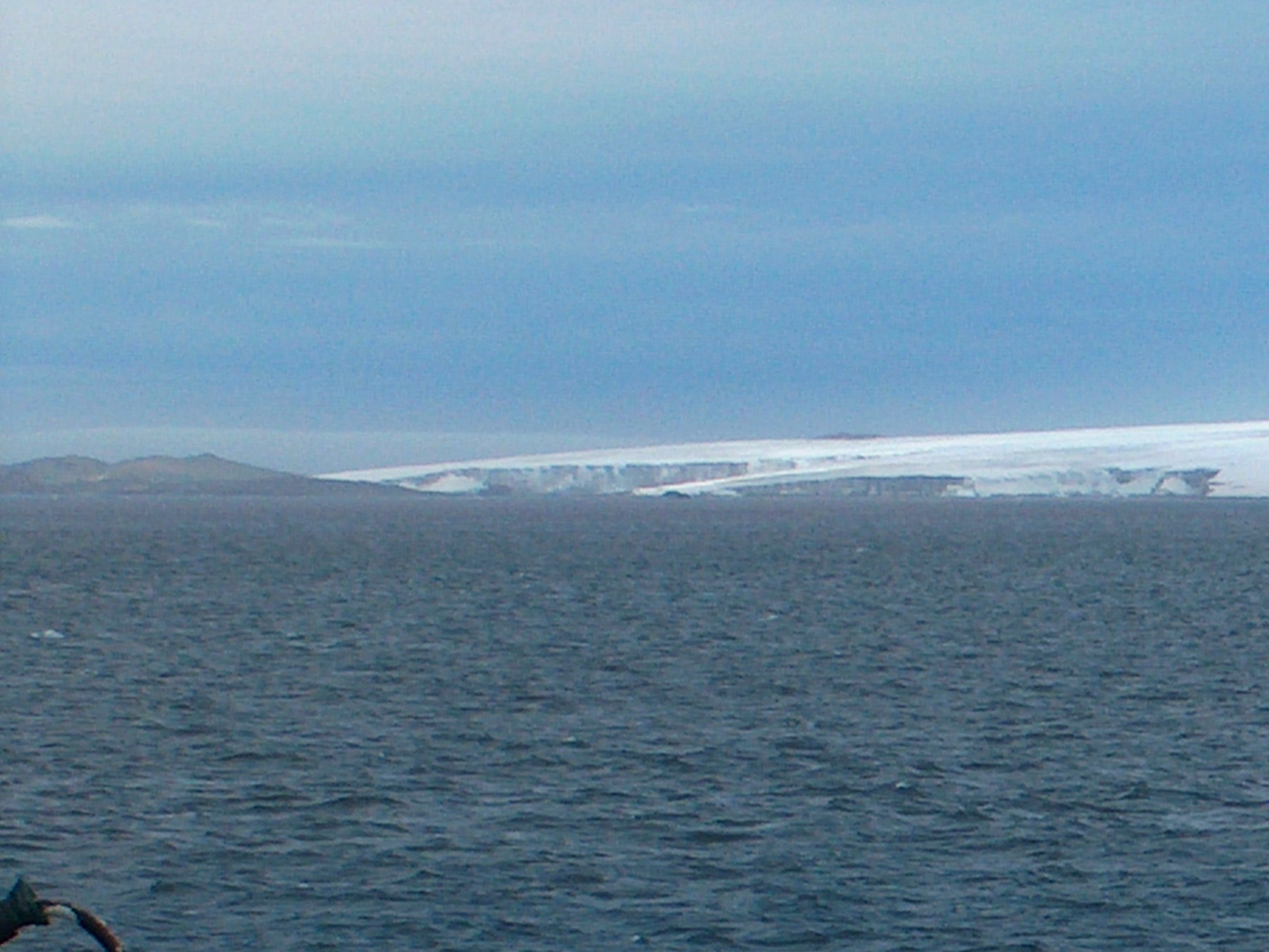
Clark Nunatak (its summit seen above Rotch Dome in the background) from near Hannah Point, with Elephant Point and Bond Point in the foreground

Topographic map of Antarctic Specially Protected Area ASPA 126 Byers Peninsula

Topographic map of Livingston Island, Greenwich, Robert, Snow and Smith Islands

Clark Nunatak is a rocky peak rising to 147 m at the southwest edge of the ice cap of Rotch Dome in western Livingston Island, South Shetland Islands, Antarctica near the south extremity of Urvich Wall. It surmounts Volturnus Lake on the south.

The feature is named after Daniel Clark, First Mate of the American sealing vessel Hersilia under Captain James Sheffield in 1820–21.

== Location ==
The nunatak is located at 62°40′03.8″S 60°54′37.5″W which is 9.25 km east of Nikopol Point, 5.8 km southeast of Tsamblak Hill, 4.07 km south-southwest of the highest point of Rotch Dome and 3.9 km northwest of Elephant Point (British mapping in 1933 and 1968, detailed Spanish mapping in 1992, and Bulgarian mapping in 2005 and 2009).

== Maps ==
- Península Byers, Isla Livingston. Mapa topográfico a escala 1:25000. Madrid: Servicio Geográfico del Ejército, 1992.
- L.L. Ivanov et al. Antarctica: Livingston Island and Greenwich Island, South Shetland Islands. Scale 1:100000 topographic map. Sofia: Antarctic Place-names Commission of Bulgaria, 2005.
- L.L. Ivanov. Antarctica: Livingston Island and Greenwich, Robert, Snow and Smith Islands. Scale 1:120000 topographic map. Troyan: Manfred Wörner Foundation, 2009. ISBN 978-954-92032-6-4
