= Nikopol Point =

Ice-free point on the south coast of Byers Peninsula, Livingston Island

Coordinates: 62°40′31″S 61°05′40″W

Location of Byers Peninsula on Livingston Island in the South Shetland Islands

Topographic map of Antarctic Specially Protected Area ASPA 126 Byers Peninsula

Topographic map of Livingston Island and Smith Island

Nikopol Point (Nos Nikopol \'nos ni-'ko-pol\) is an ice-free point on the south coast of Byers Peninsula, Livingston Island in the South Shetland Islands, Antarctica projecting 650 m east-southeastwards into Bransfield Strait and linked by a spit to Vietor Rock to the south. The area was visited by early 19th century sealers who had dwellings at the foothills of nearby Sealer Hill.

The feature is named after the town of Nikopol, Bulgaria.

The Spanish facility Camp Byers, situated near Nikopol Point, operated in 2001/02 and subsequent seasons.

== Location ==
The point is located at the west end of South Beaches, Byers Peninsula, 4.57 km east of Devils Point, 1.22 km east-southeast of Sealer Hill and 4.21 km west-southwest of Dometa Point.

== Maps ==
- Península Byers, Isla Livingston. Mapa topográfico a escala 1:25000. Madrid: Servicio Geográfico del Ejército, 1992.
- L.L. Ivanov et al. Antarctica: Livingston Island and Greenwich Island, South Shetland Islands. Scale 1:100000 topographic map. Sofia: Antarctic Place-names Commission of Bulgaria, 2005.
- L.L. Ivanov. Antarctica: Livingston Island and Greenwich, Robert, Snow and Smith Islands. Scale 1:120000 topographic map. Troyan: Manfred Wörner Foundation, 2009. ISBN 978-954-92032-6-4
- Antarctic Digital Database (ADD). Scale 1:250000 topographic map of Antarctica. Scientific Committee on Antarctic Research (SCAR). Since 1993, regularly upgraded and updated.
- L.L. Ivanov. Antarctica: Livingston Island and Smith Island. Scale 1:100000 topographic map. Manfred Wörner Foundation, 2017. ISBN 978-619-90008-3-0
