= South Beaches (Livingston Island) =

Series of beaches in Antarctica

Location of Byers Peninsula, Livingston Island in the South Shetland Islands

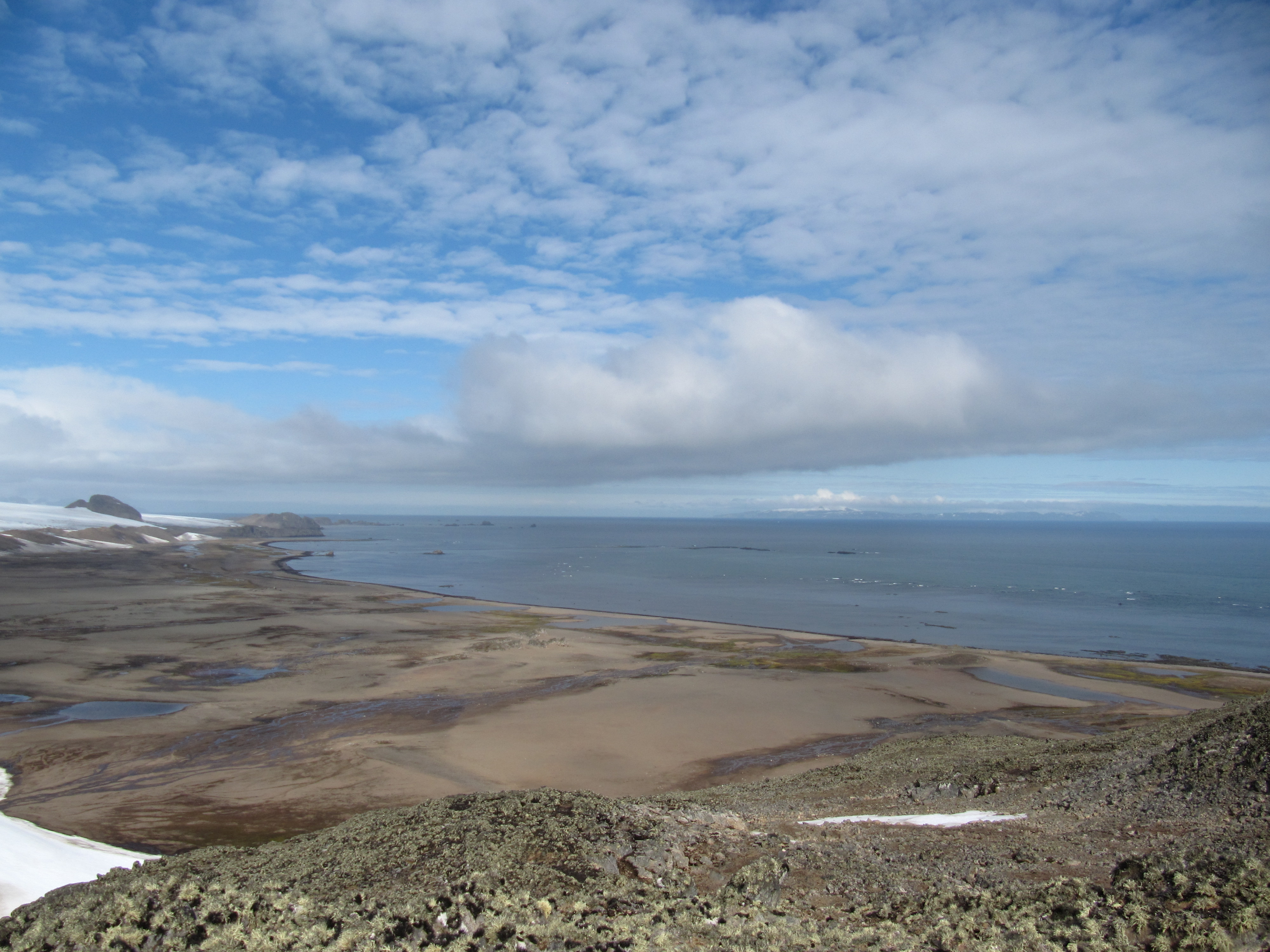
South Beaches from Basalt Lake vicinity on Byers Peninsula, Livingston Island, with Clark Nunatak, Ritli Hill, Elephant Point and Telish Rock in the left background, Stackpole Rocks on the right and Deception Island on the horizon

Topographic map of Antarctic Specially Protected Area ASPA 126 Byers Peninsula

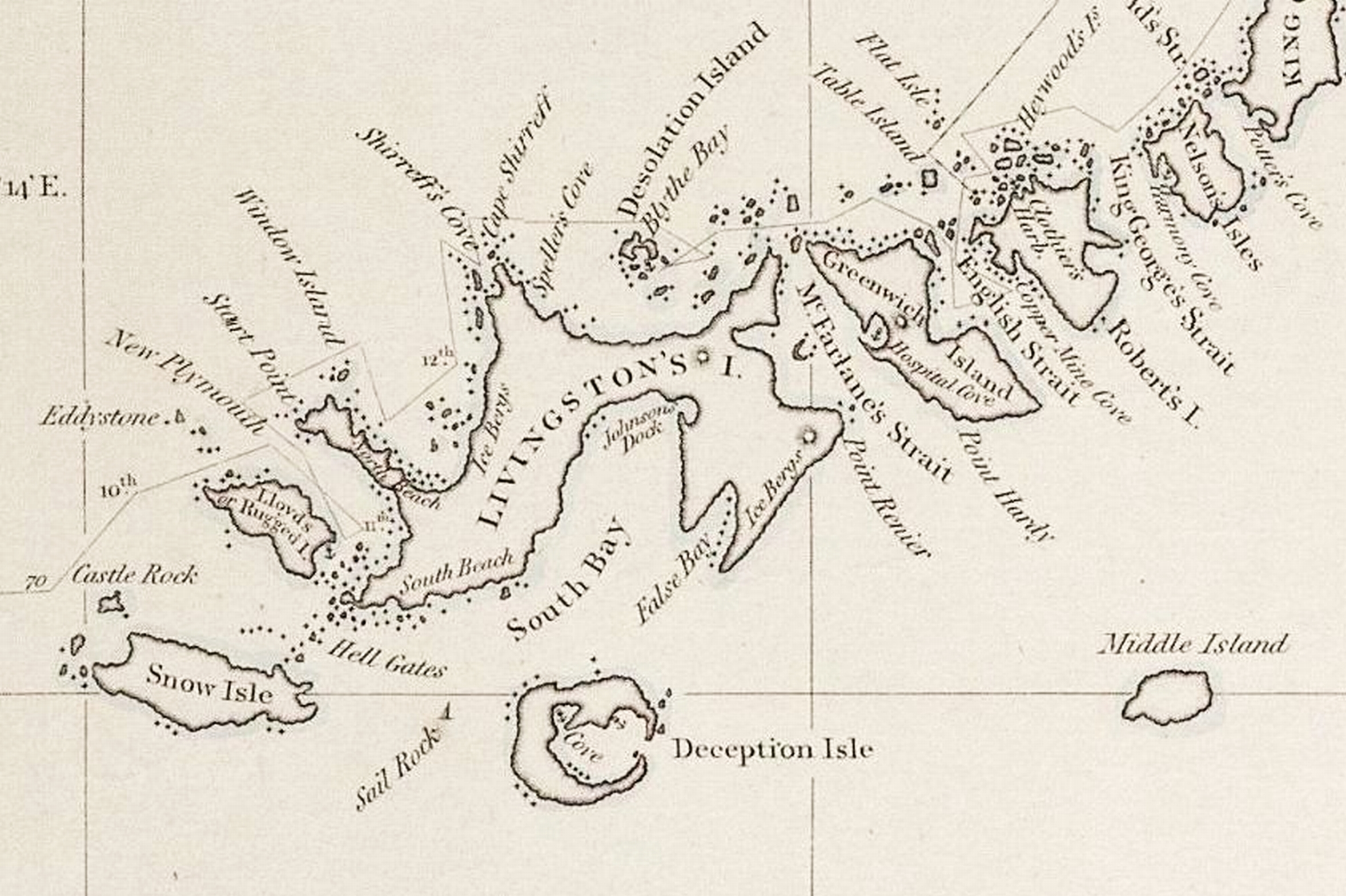
Fragment of George Powell's 1822 chart of the South Shetland Islands and South Orkney Islands featuring South Beaches (as 'South Beach')

Topographic map of Livingston Island and Smith Island

South Beaches are the beaches extending along the south side of Byers Peninsula, Livingston Island in the South Shetland Islands, Antarctica between Devils Point to the west and Rish Point to the east. The beaches were visited by 19th century sealers.

The feature was descriptively named, with the name 'South Beach' appearing on early mapping by Captain Robert Fildes and Captain George Powell in 1821 and 1822 respectively.

== Location ==
The beaches are centred at 62°39′29.8″S 61°03′24.5″W (British mapping in 1968, detailed Spanish mapping in 1992, and Bulgarian mapping in 2005 and 2009).

== Maps ==
- Chart of South Shetland including Coronation Island, &c. from the exploration of the sloop Dove in the years 1821 and 1822 by George Powell Commander of the same. Scale ca. 1:200000. London: Laurie, 1822.
- Península Byers, Isla Livingston. Mapa topográfico a escala 1:25000. Madrid: Servicio Geográfico del Ejército, 1992. (Map image on p. 55 of the linked study)
- L.L. Ivanov et al. Antarctica: Livingston Island and Greenwich Island, South Shetland Islands. Scale 1:100000 topographic map. Sofia: Antarctic Place-names Commission of Bulgaria, 2005.
- L.L. Ivanov. Antarctica: Livingston Island and Greenwich, Robert, Snow and Smith Islands. Scale 1:120000 topographic map. Troyan: Manfred Wörner Foundation, 2009. ISBN 978-954-92032-6-4
- Antarctic Digital Database (ADD). Scale 1:250000 topographic map of Antarctica. Scientific Committee on Antarctic Research (SCAR). Since 1993, regularly upgraded and updated.
- L.L. Ivanov. Antarctica: Livingston Island and Smith Island. Scale 1:100000 topographic map. Manfred Wörner Foundation, 2017. ISBN 978-619-90008-3-0
