= Chester Cone =

Mountain in Antarctica

Location of Byers Peninsula, Livingston Island in the South Shetland Islands.

Topographic map of Antarctic Specially Protected Area ASPA 126 Byers Peninsula

Topographic map of Livingston Island, Greenwich, Robert, Snow and Smith Islands.

Chester Cone is the ice-free peak rising to 188 m in the central part of Byers Peninsula, Livingston Island in the South Shetland Islands, Antarctica surmounting Midge Lake to the northwest.

The peak is named after the American Captain Chester whose sealing ship Essex visited the South Shetland Islands in 1821–22.

== Location ==
The point is located at 62°38′11.3″S 61°05′05.5″W which is 8.56 km southeast of Start Point, 6.32 km northeast of Devils Point and 4.2 km west of Tsamblak Hill (British survey in 1957/58 and mapping in 1968, detailed Spanish mapping in 1992, and Bulgarian mapping in 2005 and 2009).

== Maps ==
- Península Byers, Isla Livingston. Mapa topográfico a escala 1:25000. Madrid: Servicio Geográfico del Ejército, 1992. (Map image on p. 55 of the linked study)
- L.L. Ivanov et al. Antarctica: Livingston Island and Greenwich Island, South Shetland Islands. Scale 1:100000 topographic map. Sofia: Antarctic Place-names Commission of Bulgaria, 2005.
- L.L. Ivanov. Antarctica: Livingston Island and Greenwich, Robert, Snow and Smith Islands. Scale 1:120000 topographic map. Troyan: Manfred Wörner Foundation, 2009. ISBN 978-954-92032-6-4
