= Byers Peninsula =

Peninsula in the South Shetland Islands of Antarctica

Coordinates: 62°38′S 61°05′W

Location of Byers Peninsula, Livingston Island in the South Shetland Islands

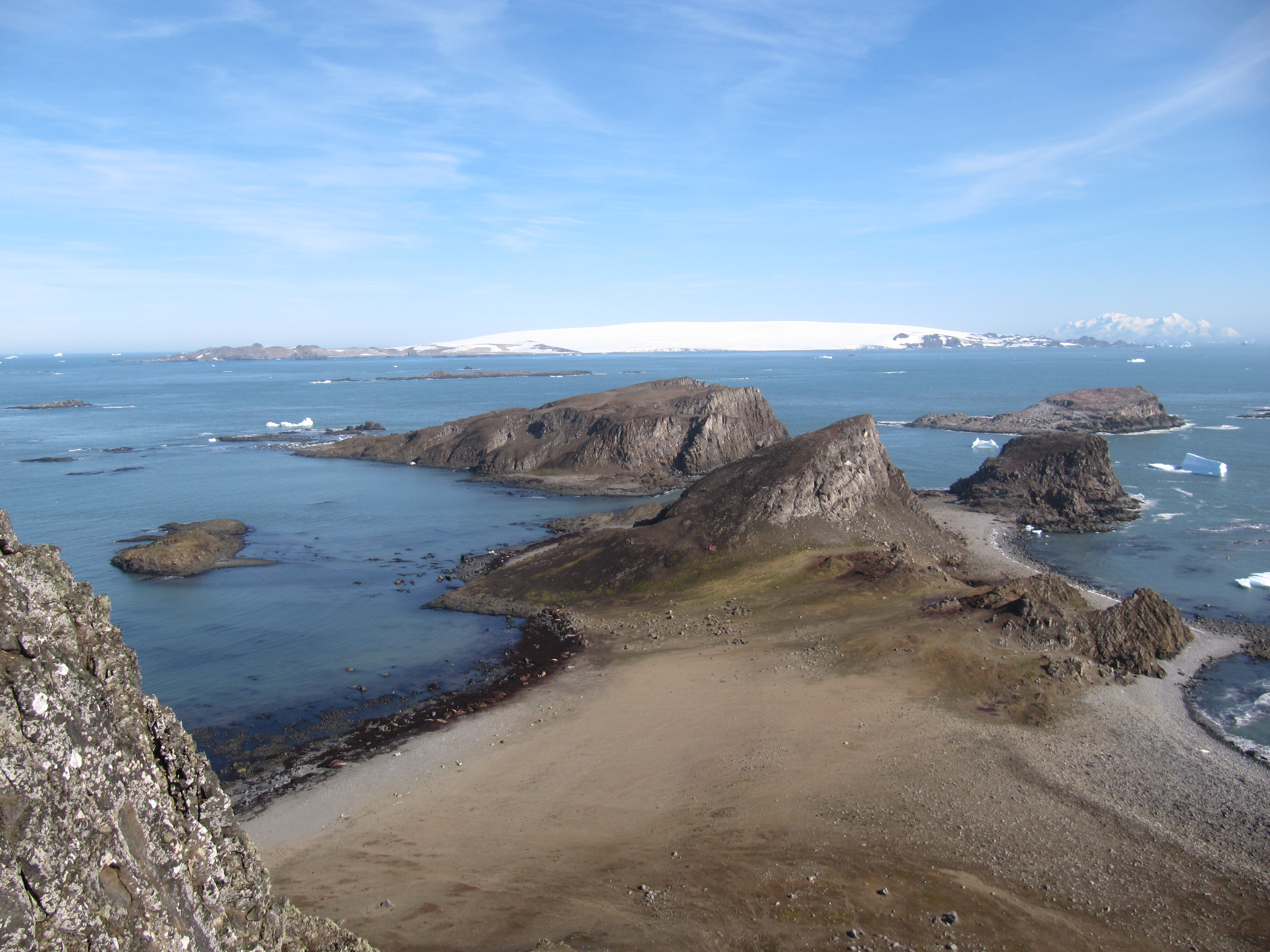
Devils Point from Lucifer Crags, with Hell Gates and Vardim Rocks in the middle ground, Long Rock in Morton Strait and Snow Island in the background, and Smith Island seen on the horizon on the right

Byers Peninsula is a mainly ice-free peninsula forming the west end of Livingston Island in the South Shetland Islands of Antarctica. It occupies 60 km^{2} (23 sq mi), borders Ivanov Beach to the northeast and is separated from Rotch Dome on the east by the ridge of Urvich Wall. The peninsula features more than 60 meltwater streams and as many lakes, notably Midge Lake, Limnopolar Lake and Basalt Lake. Byers Peninsula has a regime of special environmental protection under the Antarctic Treaty System and requires a permit to enter.

== History ==
The feature was named by the UK Antarctic Place-names Committee in 1958 for James Byers, a New York shipowner who tried unsuccessfully in August 1820 to induce the United States Government to found a settlement in and take possession of the South Shetland Islands. Byers organized and sent out a fleet of American sealers from New York to the South Shetland Islands in 1820–21. It was visited by early 19th century American and British sealers who came almost exclusively from New England, New York and England. They operated on President Beaches, Robbery Beaches and South Beaches, and built dwellings and shelter such as those still preserved at Sealer Hill and Lair Point.

== Antarctic Specially Protected Area ==
Map of Byers Peninsula featuring Antarctic Specially Protected Area ASPA 126 and its two restricted zones Ray Promontory and Ivanov Beach

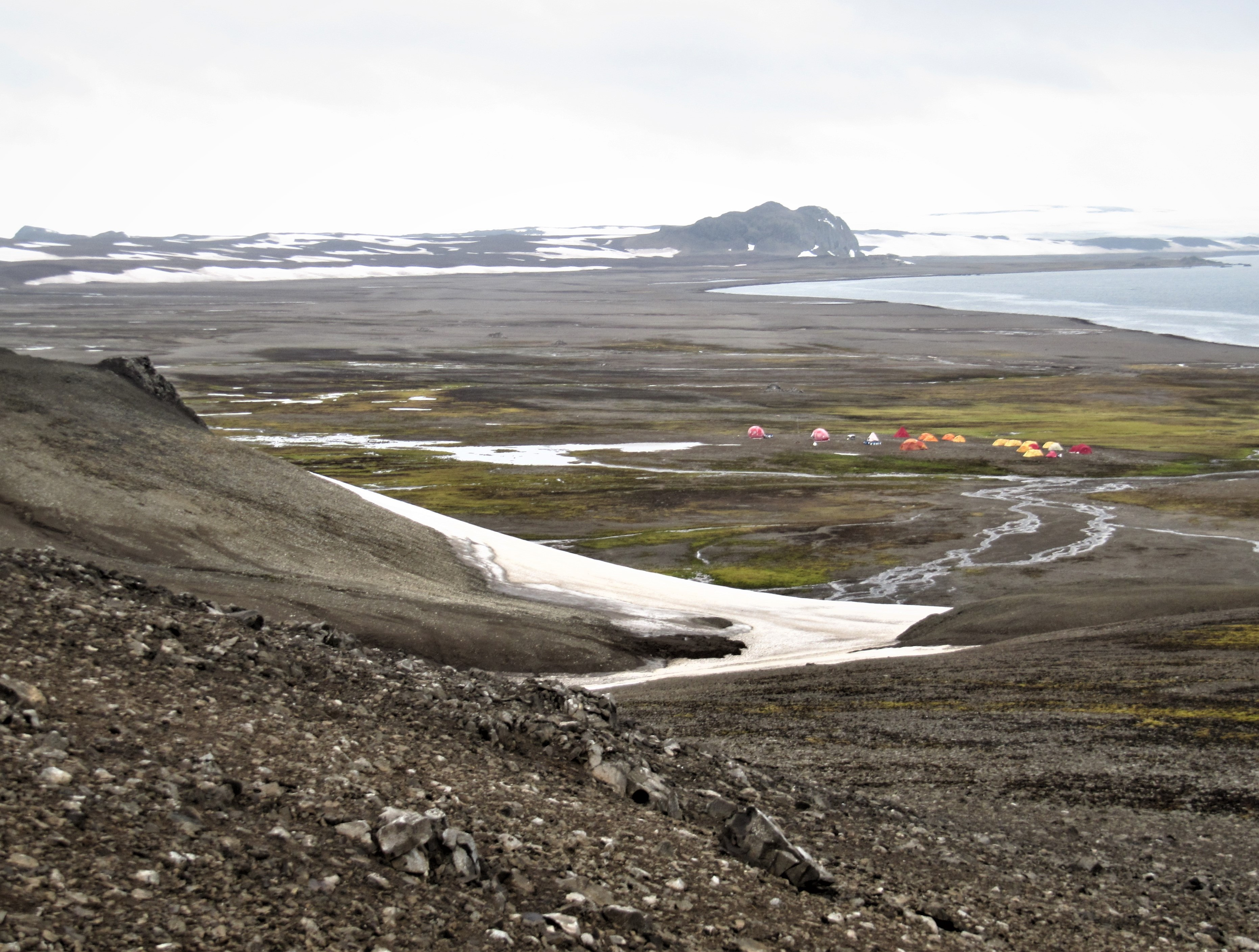
South Beaches on Byers Peninsula, Livingston Island, with Camp Byers (International Field Camp) in the foreground, and left to right Tsamblak Hill, Negro Hill and Dometa Point in the background

The peninsula has been designated an Antarctic Specially Protected Area (ASPA 126) for its outstanding environmental values (specifically its biological diversity and terrestrial and lake ecosystems), and a combination of other values including scientific (terrestrial biology, limnology, ornithology, palaeolimnology, geomorphology and geology), historic (artefacts and refuge remains of early sealers) and wilderness values. It has diverse and well-developed vegetation, numerous lakes and freshwater pools which support the restricted-range insects Parochlus steinenii and Belgica antarctica, and well-preserved sub-fossil whale bones in raised beaches. It also has the greatest concentration of historical sites in Antarctica, containing the remains of refuges, with their contemporary artefacts, and shipwrecks of early 19th century sealing expeditions.

The eastern boundary of the protected area was shifted eastwards to 60º53'45"W in 2016 to include besides Byers Peninsula also all ice-free ground and ice sheet west of Clark Nunatak and Rowe Point, increasing the overall surface area of the protected territory to 84.7 km^{2} (32.7 sq mi). Excepting Vardim Rocks, no offshore islets or rocks are protected. In particular, Rugged Island, Window Island and Astor Island are not protected.

Two restricted zones in the protected territory that are of scientific importance to Antarctic microbiology have been further designated with greater restriction placed on access with the aim of preventing microbial or other contamination by human activity: Ray Promontory in the west, and northwestern Rotch Dome, northern Urvich Wall Ridge and adjacent deglaciated ground on Ivanov Beach in the east.

== Important Bird Area ==
The protected territory ASPA 126 Byers Peninsula has been identified as an Important Bird Area (IBA) by BirdLife International because it supports breeding colonies of Antarctic terns (1760 pairs) and kelp gulls (450 pairs). Other birds nesting on the peninsula include chinstrap and gentoo penguins, Wilson's and black-bellied storm petrels, Cape petrels, southern giant petrels, imperial shags, brown skuas and snowy sheathbills. Large numbers of southern elephant seals haul out during their breeding season.

== See also ==
- Camp Byers
- Camp Livingston
- Livingston Island

== Maps ==
Topographic map of Livingston Island

- Chart of South Shetland including Coronation Island, &c. from the exploration of the sloop Dove in the years 1821 and 1822 by George Powell Commander of the same. Scale ca. 1:200000. London: Laurie, 1822.
- Península Byers, Isla Livingston. Mapa topográfico a escala 1:25000. Madrid: Servicio Geográfico del Ejército, 1992. (Map image on p. 55 of the linked study)
- L.L. Ivanov et al. Antarctica: Livingston Island and Greenwich Island, South Shetland Islands. Scale 1:100000 topographic map. Sofia: Antarctic Place-names Commission of Bulgaria, 2005.
- L.L. Ivanov. Antarctica: Livingston Island and Greenwich, Robert, Snow and Smith Islands. Scale 1:120000 topographic map. Troyan: Manfred Wörner Foundation, 2010. ISBN 978-954-92032-9-5 (First edition 2009. ISBN 978-954-92032-6-4)
- South Shetland Islands: Livingston Island, Byers Peninsula. Scale 1:50000 satellite map. UK Antarctic Place-names Committee, 2010.
- Antarctic Digital Database (ADD). Scale 1:250000 topographic map of Antarctica. Scientific Committee on Antarctic Research (SCAR). Since 1993, regularly updated.
- L.L. Ivanov. Antarctica: Livingston Island and Smith Island. Scale 1:100000 topographic map. Manfred Wörner Foundation, 2017. ISBN 978-619-90008-3-0

== In fiction ==
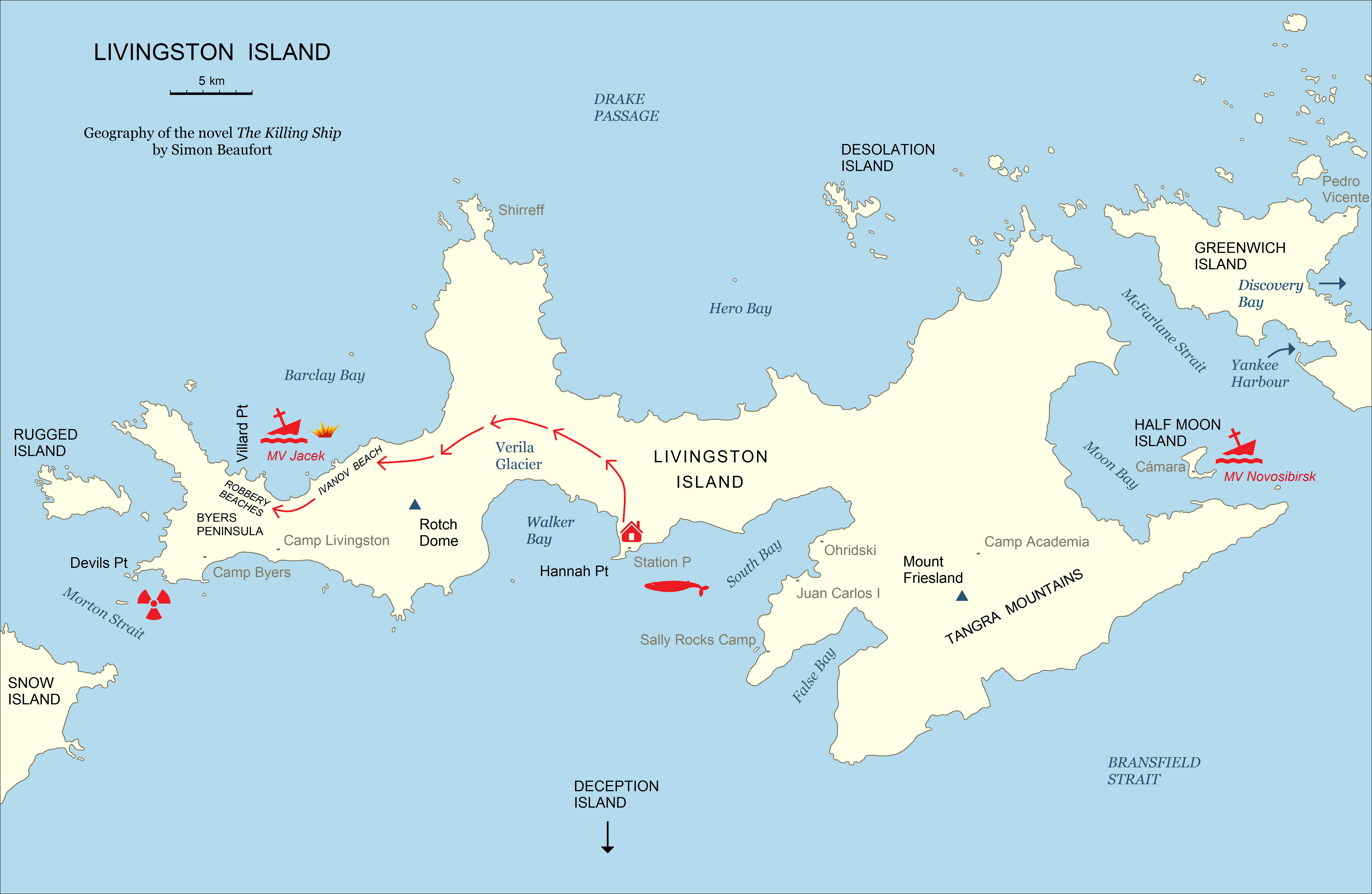
Geography of the thriller novel The Killing Ship by Simon Beaufort

Byers Peninsula is part of the mise-en-scène in the Antarctica thriller novel The Killing Ship authored by Elizabeth Cruwys and Beau Riffenburgh under their joint alias Simon Beaufort in 2016.
