= Arroyo Point =

Geographic feature in the South Shetland Islands, Antarctica

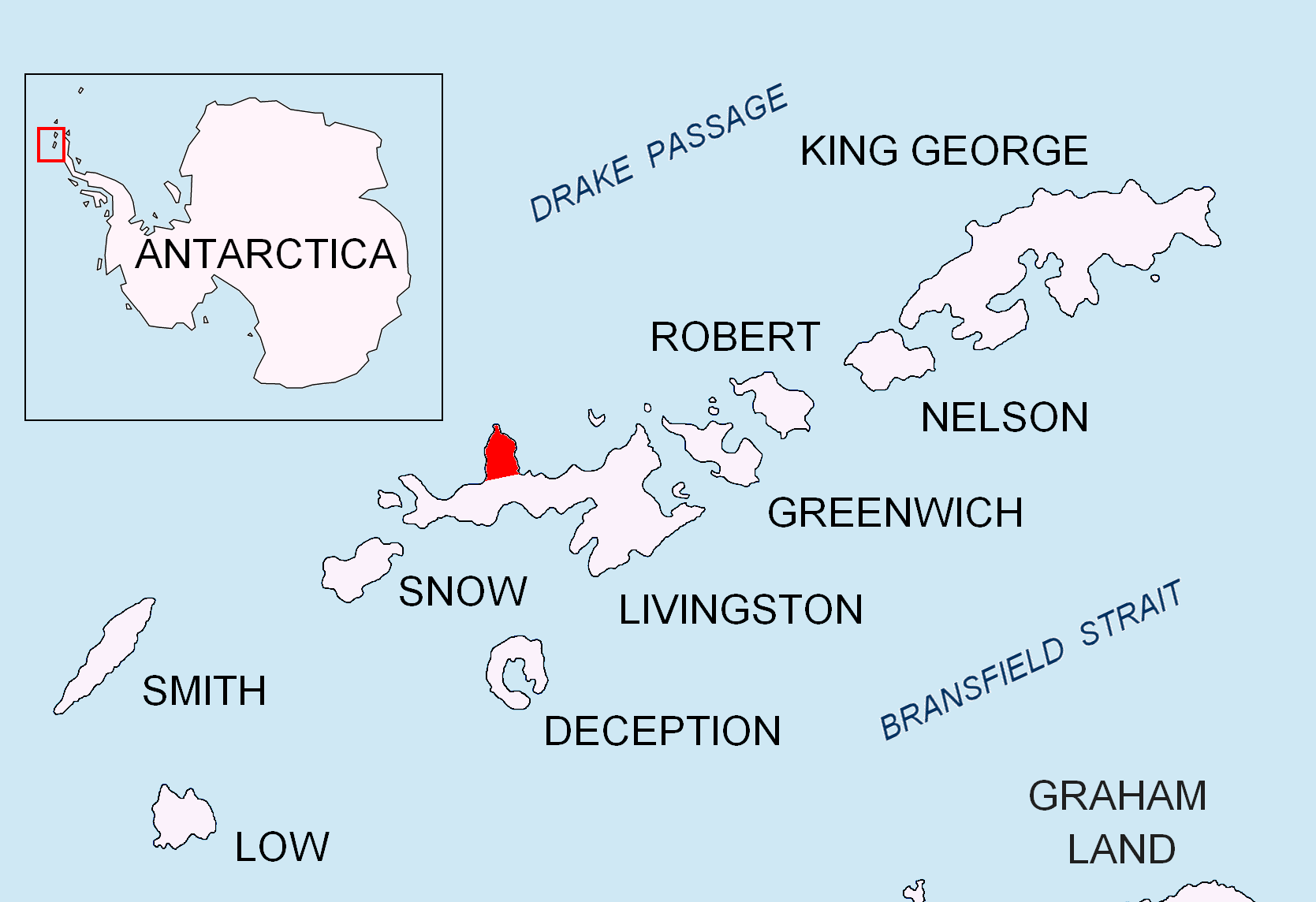
Location of Ioannes Paulus II Peninsula on Livingston Island in the South Shetland Islands

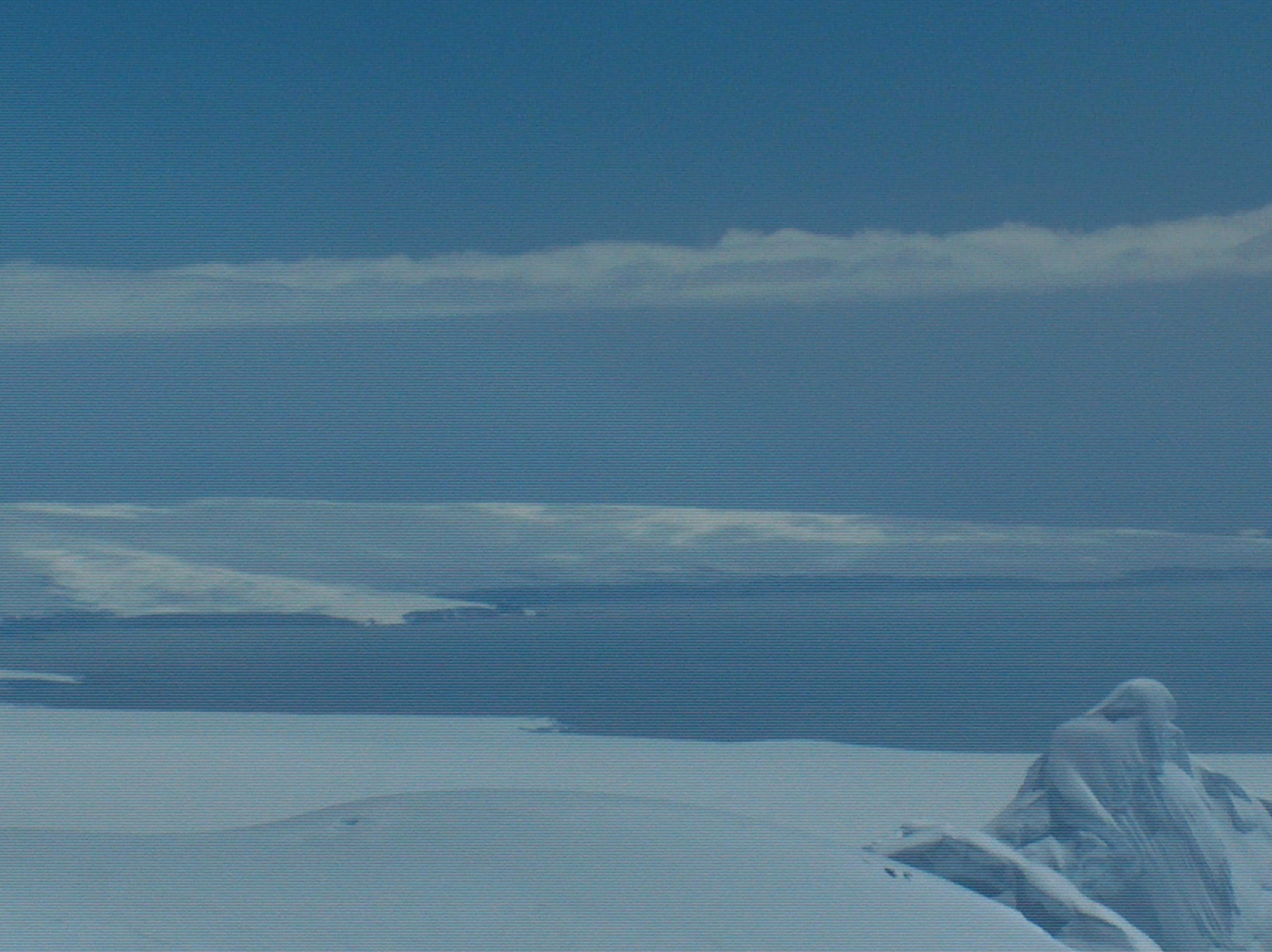
Arroyo Point (on the right) and Ioannes Paulus II Peninsula in the background, from Catalunyan Saddle; Burdick Ridge in the foreground

Topographic map of Livingston Island and Smith Island

Arroyo Point is the northeast extremity of a trapezoid-shaped and mostly ice-covered headland projecting 900 m from the east coast of Ioannes Paulus II Peninsula into Hero Bay, Livingston Island in the South Shetland Islands, Antarctica. The point forms the south side of the entrance to Stoyanov Cove and, together with nearby Agüero Point, separates the termini of Urdoviza Glacier to the north from Medven Glacier to the south.

The feature is named after Jesús Arroyo, a crewman of the Argentine Navy Lockheed Neptune aircraft that crashed in poor weather on the slopes of Mount Friesland on 15 September 1976.

== Location ==
The point is located at 62°32′03″S 60°41′05″W which is 850 m north-northwest of Agüero Point, 5.6 km south by east of Black Point and 4.7 km northwest of Avitohol Point (British mapping in 1968, Chilean in 1971, Argentine in 1980, Spanish in 1991, and Bulgarian in 2005, 2009 and 2017).

== See also ==
- Ioannes Paulus II Peninsula
- Livingston Island

== Maps ==
- L. Ivanov et al. Antarctica: Livingston Island and Greenwich Island, South Shetland Islands. Scale 1:100000 topographic map. Sofia: Antarctic Place-names Commission of Bulgaria, 2005.
- L. Ivanov. Antarctica: Livingston Island and Greenwich, Robert, Snow and Smith Islands. Scale 1:120000 topographic map. Troyan: Manfred Wörner Foundation, 2009. ISBN 978-954-92032-6-4
- L. Ivanov. Antarctica: Livingston Island and Smith Island. Scale 1:100000 topographic map. Manfred Wörner Foundation, 2017. ISBN 978-619-90008-3-0
