= Remetalk Point =

Point on Livingston Island, Antarctica

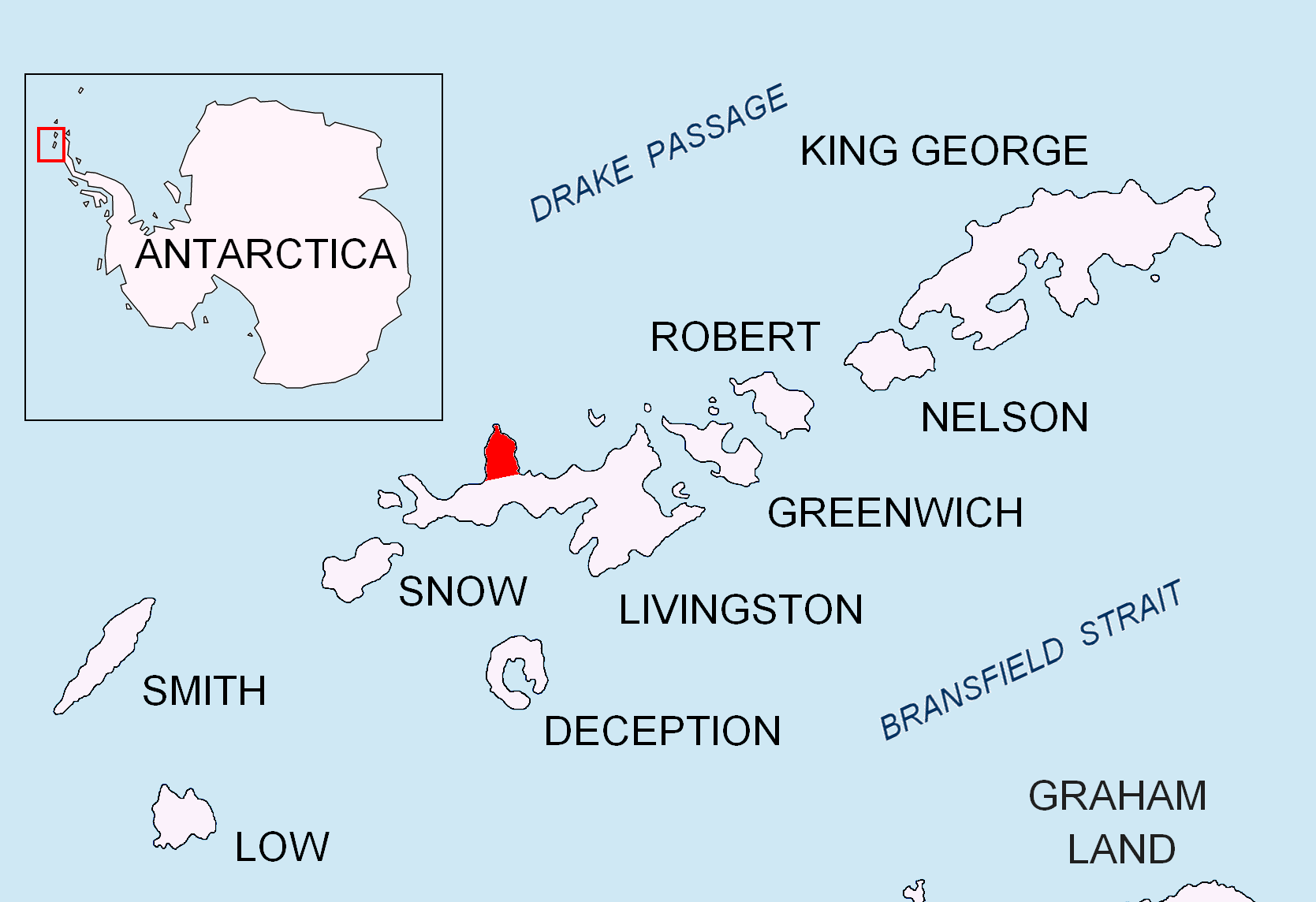
Location of Ioannes Paulus II Peninsula on Livingston Island in the South Shetland Islands.

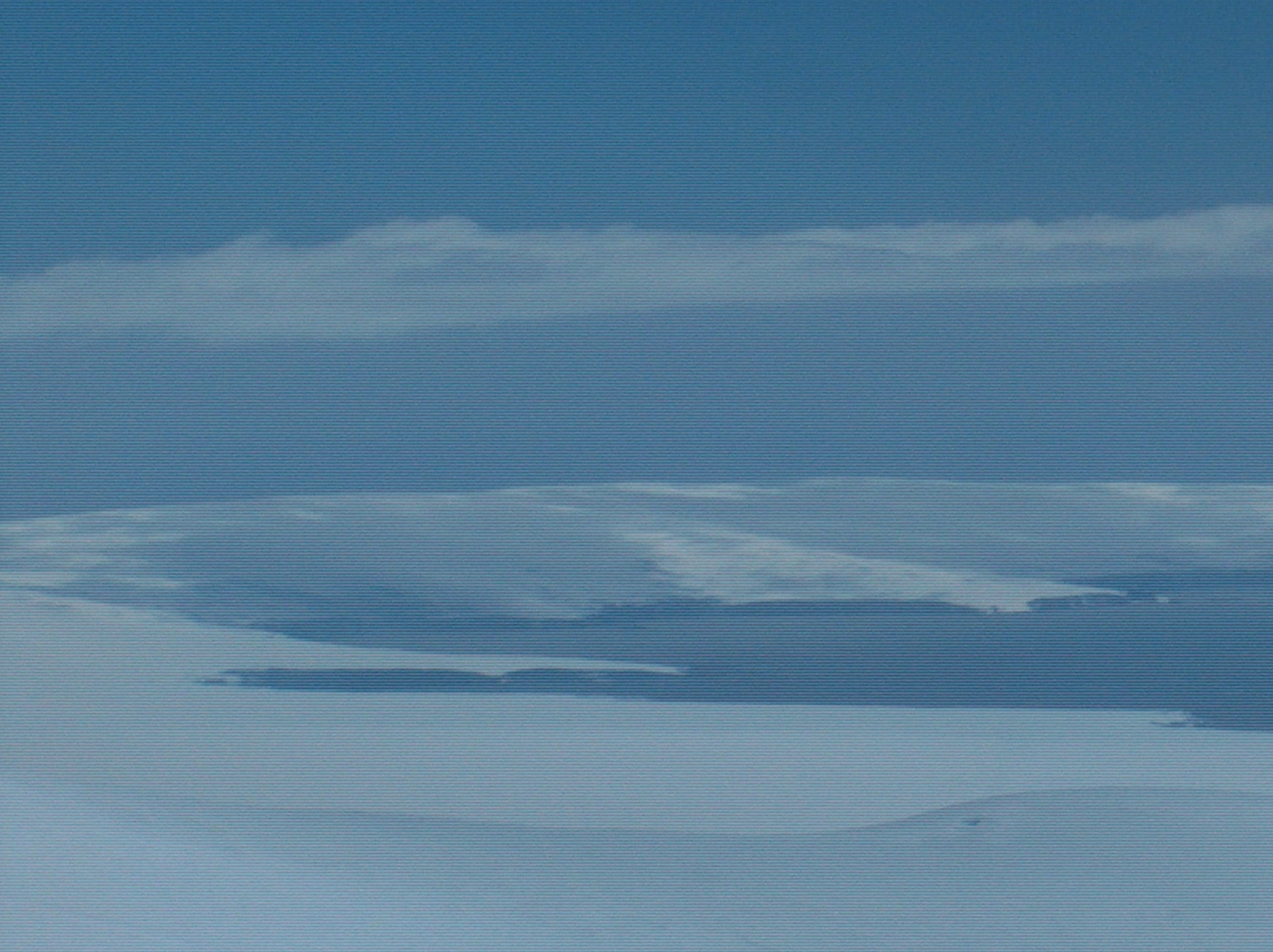
Remetalk Point from northern Friesland Ridge.

Topographic map of Livingston Island and Smith Island.

Remetalk Point is a point on the east coast of the Ioannes Paulus II Peninsula, Livingston Island in the South Shetland Islands, Antarctica formed by an offshoot of Oryahovo Heights. It separates the glacier termini of Medven Glacier to the north and Berkovitsa Glacier to the south.

The point is named after the 1st century AD Thracian king Remetalk III (Rhoemetalces III).

== Location ==
The cliff is located at 62°33′06″S 60°41′06″W, which is 1.3 km south of Agüero Point, and 3.7 km west-northwest of Avitohol Point and 3.74 km north-northeast of Casanovas Peak (Bulgarian mapping in 2009).

== Map ==
- L.L. Ivanov. Antarctica: Livingston Island and Greenwich, Robert, Snow and Smith Islands. Scale 1:120000 topographic map. Troyan: Manfred Wörner Foundation, 2009. ISBN 978-954-92032-6-4
- Antarctic Digital Database (ADD). Scale 1:250000 topographic map of Antarctica. Scientific Committee on Antarctic Research (SCAR). Since 1993, regularly upgraded and updated.
- L.L. Ivanov. Antarctica: Livingston Island and Smith Island. Scale 1:100000 topographic map. Manfred Wörner Foundation, 2017. ISBN 978-619-90008-3-0
