= Sandanski Point =

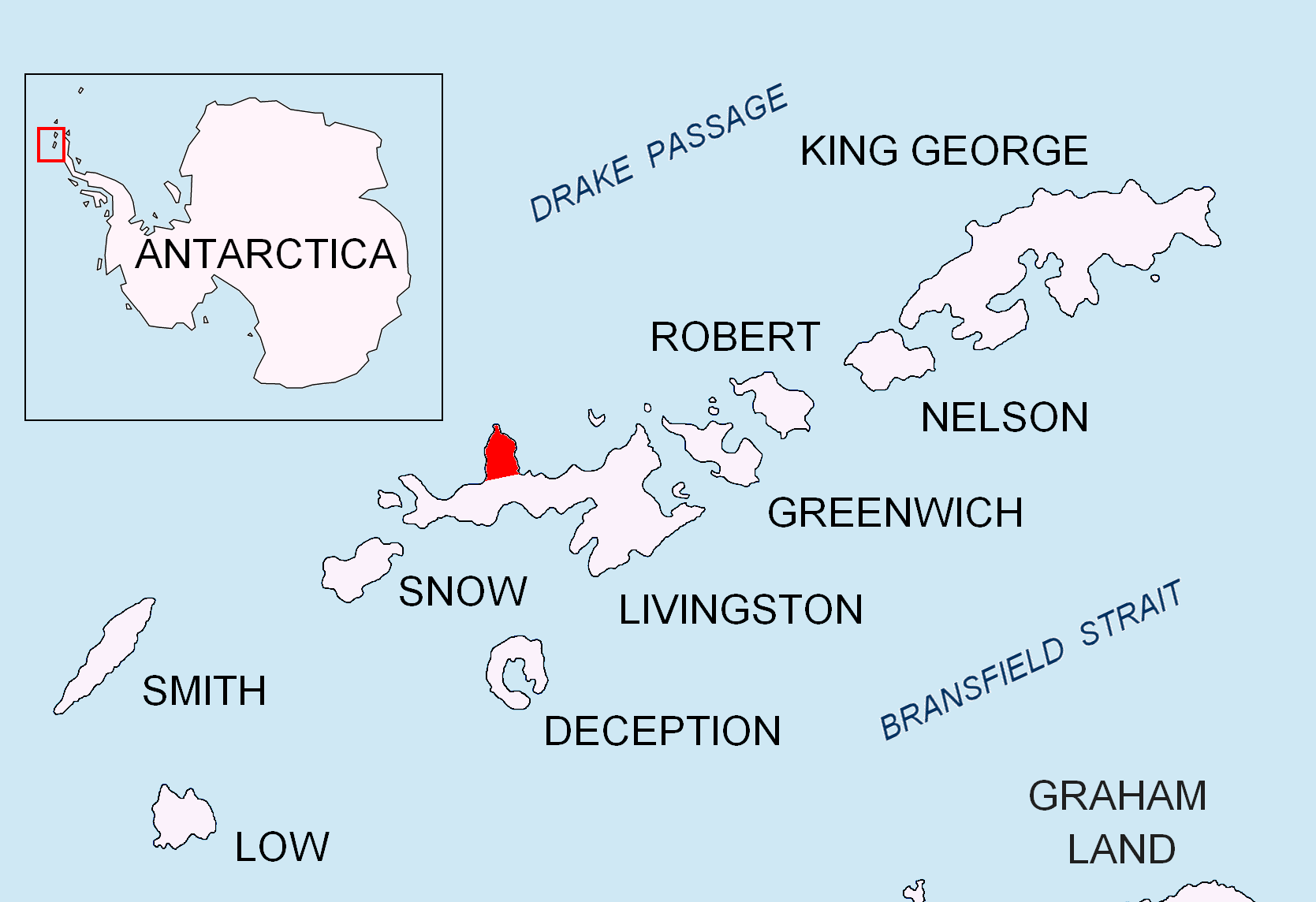
Location of Ioannes Paulus II Peninsula on Livingston Island in the South Shetland Islands.

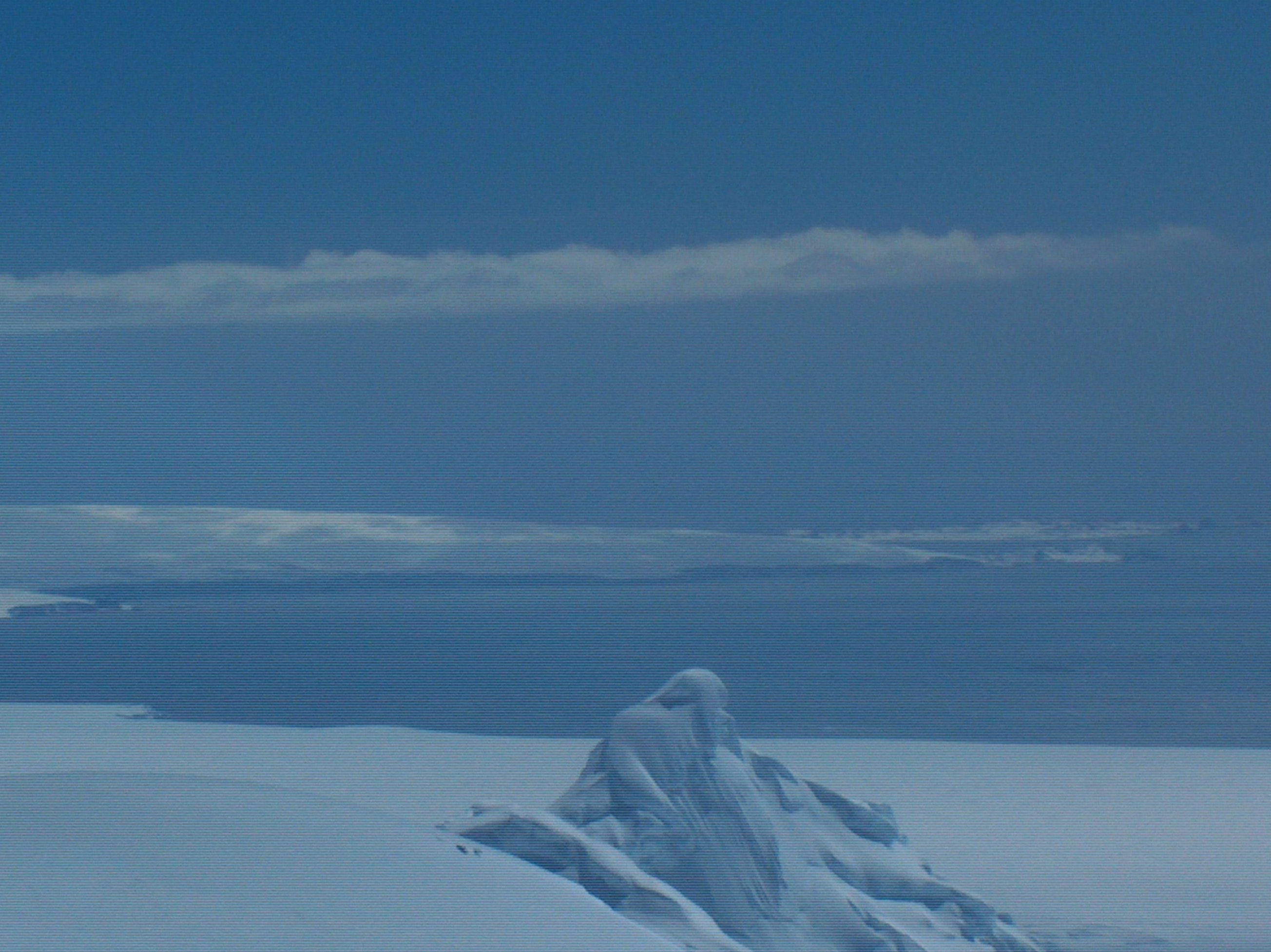
Sandanski Point on the Ioannes Paulus II Peninsula in the background, from Catalunyan Saddle; Burdick Ridge in the foreground.

Topographic map of Livingston Island, Greenwich, Robert, Snow and Smith Islands.

Sandanski Point (Nos Sandanski \'nos san-'dan-ski\) is the point forming the north side of the entrance to Stoyanov Cove on the east coast of Ioannes Paulus II Peninsula, Livingston Island in the South Shetland Islands, Antarctica, projecting 600 m into Hero Bay and formed by an offshoot of Oryahovo Heights.

The point is named after the town of Sandanski in southwestern Bulgaria in connection with Yane Sandanski (1872–1915), a leader of the Bulgarian liberation movement in Macedonia.

== Location ==
The point is located at 62°30′41.5″S 60°41′49″W which is 3.4 km north by west of Agüero Point, and 2.8 km south by east of Black Point.

== Maps ==
- L.L. Ivanov et al. Antarctica: Livingston Island and Greenwich Island, South Shetland Islands. Scale 1:100000 topographic map. Sofia: Antarctic Place-names Commission of Bulgaria, 2005.
- L.L. Ivanov. Antarctica: Livingston Island and Greenwich, Robert, Snow and Smith Islands. Scale 1:120000 topographic map. Troyan: Manfred Wörner Foundation, 2009. ISBN 978-954-92032-6-4
