= Prisoe Cove =

Location of Prisoe Cove in Antarctica

Location of Livingston Island in the South Shetland Islands.

Topographic map of Livingston Island and Smith Island.

Prisoe Cove (Bulgarian: залив Присое, ‘Zaliv Prisoe’ \'za-liv pri-'so-e\) is the 3.7 km wide cove indenting for 1.75 km the north coast of Livingston Island in the South Shetland Islands, Antarctica. Entered between Agüero Point and Avitohol Point. Most of the cove's coastline is formed by the termini of Berkovitsa Glacier and Medven Glacier separated by Remetalk Point.

The cove is named after the settlement of Prisoeto in northern Bulgaria.

== Location ==
Prisoe Cove is located at 62°33′25″S 60°40′00″W. British mapping in 1968, Spanish in 1991, and Bulgarian in 2005 and 2009.

== Map ==
- L.L. Ivanov. Antarctica: Livingston Island and Greenwich, Robert, Snow and Smith Islands. Scale 1:120000 topographic map. Troyan: Manfred Wörner Foundation, 2009. ISBN 978-954-92032-6-4
- Antarctic Digital Database (ADD). Scale 1:250000 topographic map of Antarctica. Scientific Committee on Antarctic Research (SCAR). Since 1993, regularly upgraded and updated.
- L.L. Ivanov. Antarctica: Livingston Island and Smith Island. Scale 1:100000 topographic map. Manfred Wörner Foundation, 2017. ISBN 978-619-90008-3-0
