= Urdoviza Glacier =

Glacier in Antarctica

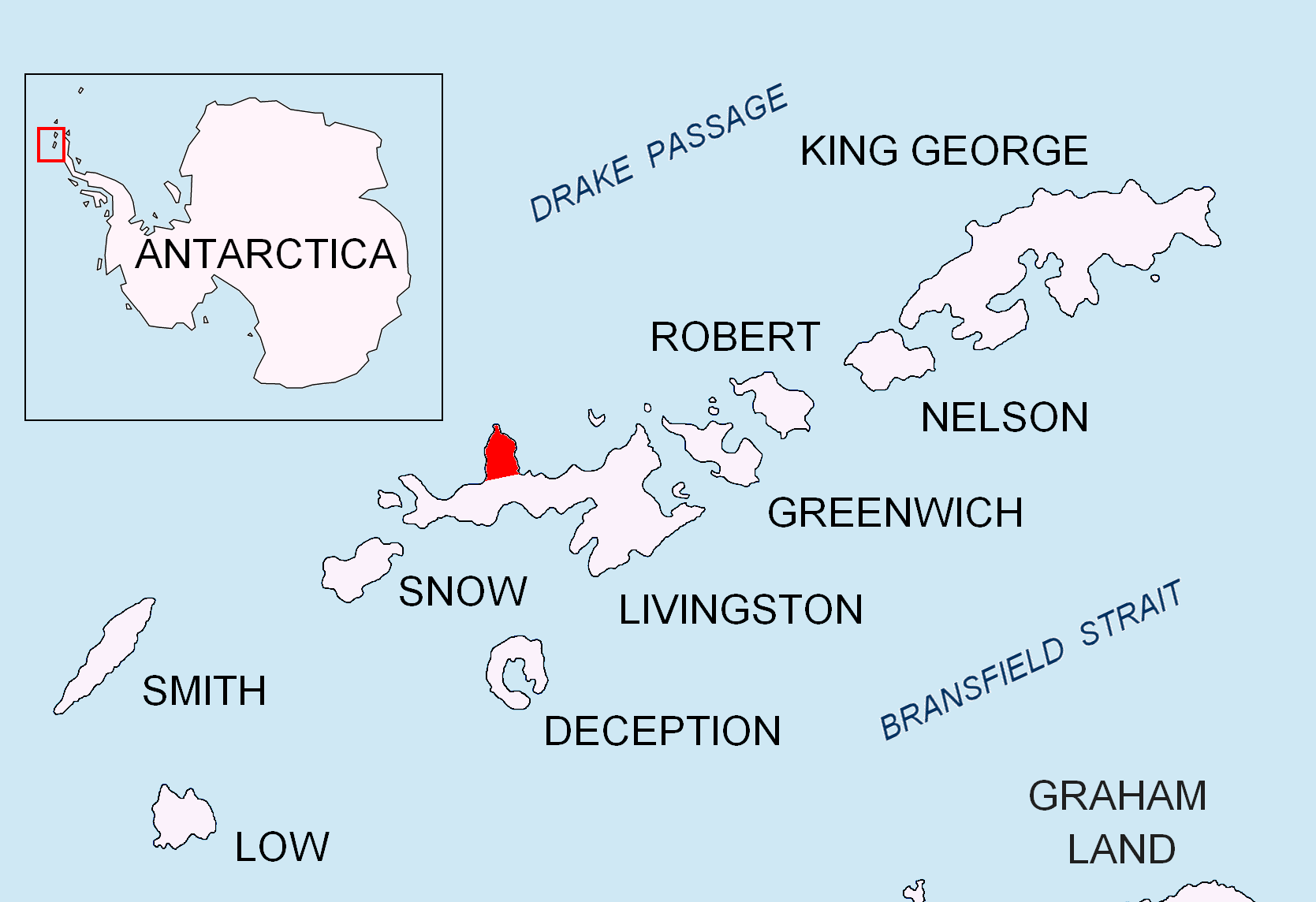
- Location of Ioannes Paulus II Peninsula on Livingston Island in the South Shetland Islands

- Location within South Shetland Islands Location within Antarctica
- Location: Livingston Island; South Shetland Islands
- Coordinates: 62°31′45″S 60°43′40″W
- Length: 1.6 nautical miles (3.0 km; 1.8 mi)
- Width: 1.5 nautical miles (2.8 km; 1.7 mi)
- Thickness: unknown
- Terminus: Stoyanov Cove
- Status: unknown

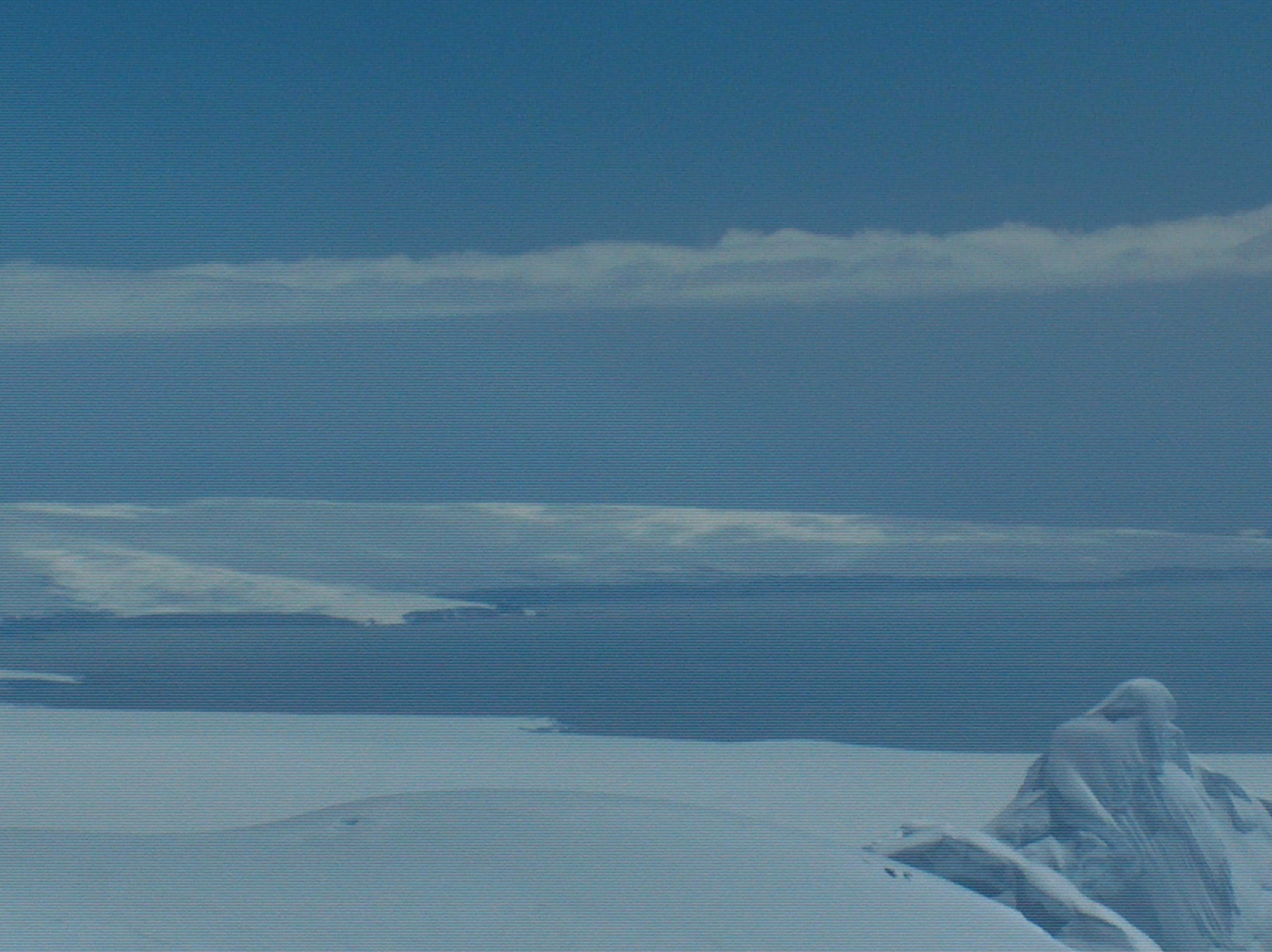
Urdoviza Glacier and Ioannes Paulus II Peninsula in the background, from Catalunyan Saddle; Burdick Ridge in the foreground.

Topographic map of Livingston Island and Smith Island

Urdoviza Glacier (Bulgarian: ледник Урдовиза, romanized: lednik Urdoviza, IPA: [ˈlɛdnik ordoˈvizɐ]) is a glacier on western Livingston Island in the South Shetland Islands, Antarctica situated east of the northern portion of Etar Snowfield and north of Medven Glacier. It extends 1.5 nautical miles (2.8 km; 1.7 mi) in the east-west direction and 1.5 nautical miles (2.8 km; 1.7 mi) in the north-south direction, and is bounded by the eastern slopes of Oryahovo Heights and draining eastwards into Stoyanov Cove of Hero Bay between Agüero Point and Sandanski Point. Bulgarian mapping in 2005 and 2009.

The glacier is named after Cape Urdoviza on the Bulgarian Black Sea coast.

== Location ==
The glacier's midpoint is located at 62°31′45″S 60°43′40″W.

== See also ==
- List of glaciers in the Antarctic
- Glaciology

== Maps ==
- L.L. Ivanov et al. Antarctica: Livingston Island and Greenwich Island, South Shetland Islands. Scale 1:100000 topographic map. Sofia: Antarctic Place-names Commission of Bulgaria, 2005.
- L.L. Ivanov. Antarctica: Livingston Island and Greenwich, Robert, Snow and Smith Islands. Scale 1:120000 topographic map. Troyan: Manfred Wörner Foundation, 2009. ISBN 978-954-92032-6-4
