= Casanovas Peak =

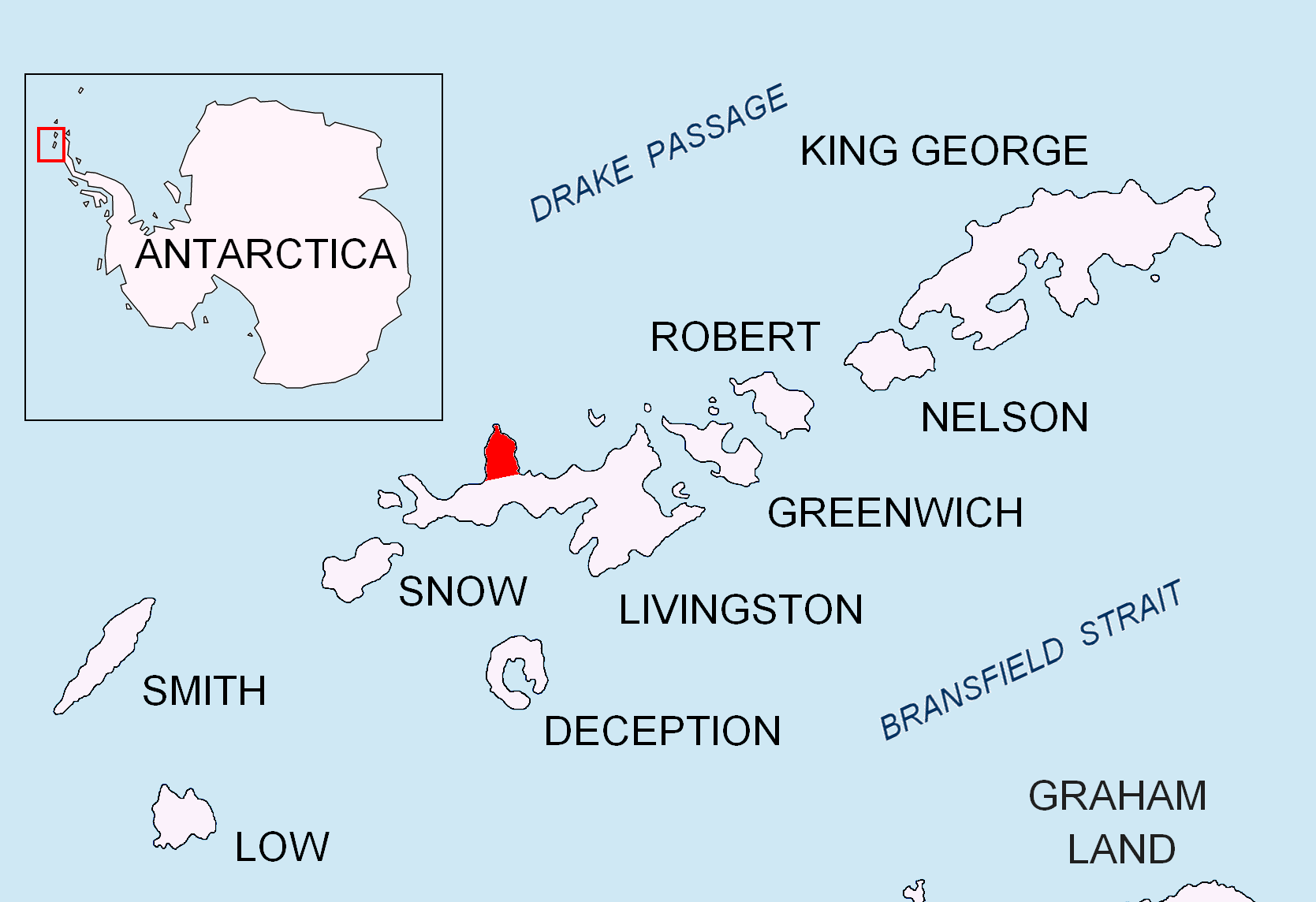
Location of Ioannes Paulus II Peninsula on Livingston Island in the South Shetland Islands

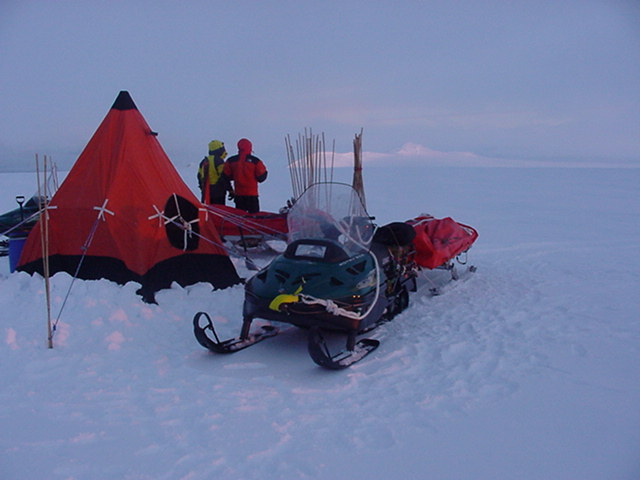
Casanovas Peak; Snow Peak in the background

Topographic map of Livingston Island and Smith Island

Casanovas Peak (Bulgarian: връх Касановас, romanized: vrah Kasanovas, IPA: [ˈvrɤx kɐsɐˈnɔvɐs]) is the ice dome rising to 325 m at the base of Ioannes Paulus II Peninsula on Livingston Island, South Shetland Islands. It is linked to Rotch Dome on the west by Berrister Gap and surmounts Etar Snowfield to the northwest, Berkovitsa Glacier to the northeast and Verila Glacier to the south.

The feature is named for Àlex S.Casanovas, mountain guides’ team leader at Juan Carlos I Base in 2001–06, who surveyed the peak during the 2000-01 austral summer.

== Location ==
The peak is located at 62°34′59″S 60°42′43″W which is 3 km west of Snow Peak and 9.3 km northeast of Rotch Dome (Bulgarian mapping in 2009).

== Maps ==
- L.L. Ivanov et al. Antarctica: Livingston Island and Greenwich Island, South Shetland Islands. Scale 1:100000 topographic map. Sofia: Antarctic Place-names Commission of Bulgaria, 2005.
- L.L. Ivanov. Antarctica: Livingston Island and Greenwich, Robert, Snow and Smith Islands. Scale 1:120000 topographic map. Troyan: Manfred Wörner Foundation, 2009. ISBN 978-954-92032-6-4
