= Stoyanov Cove =

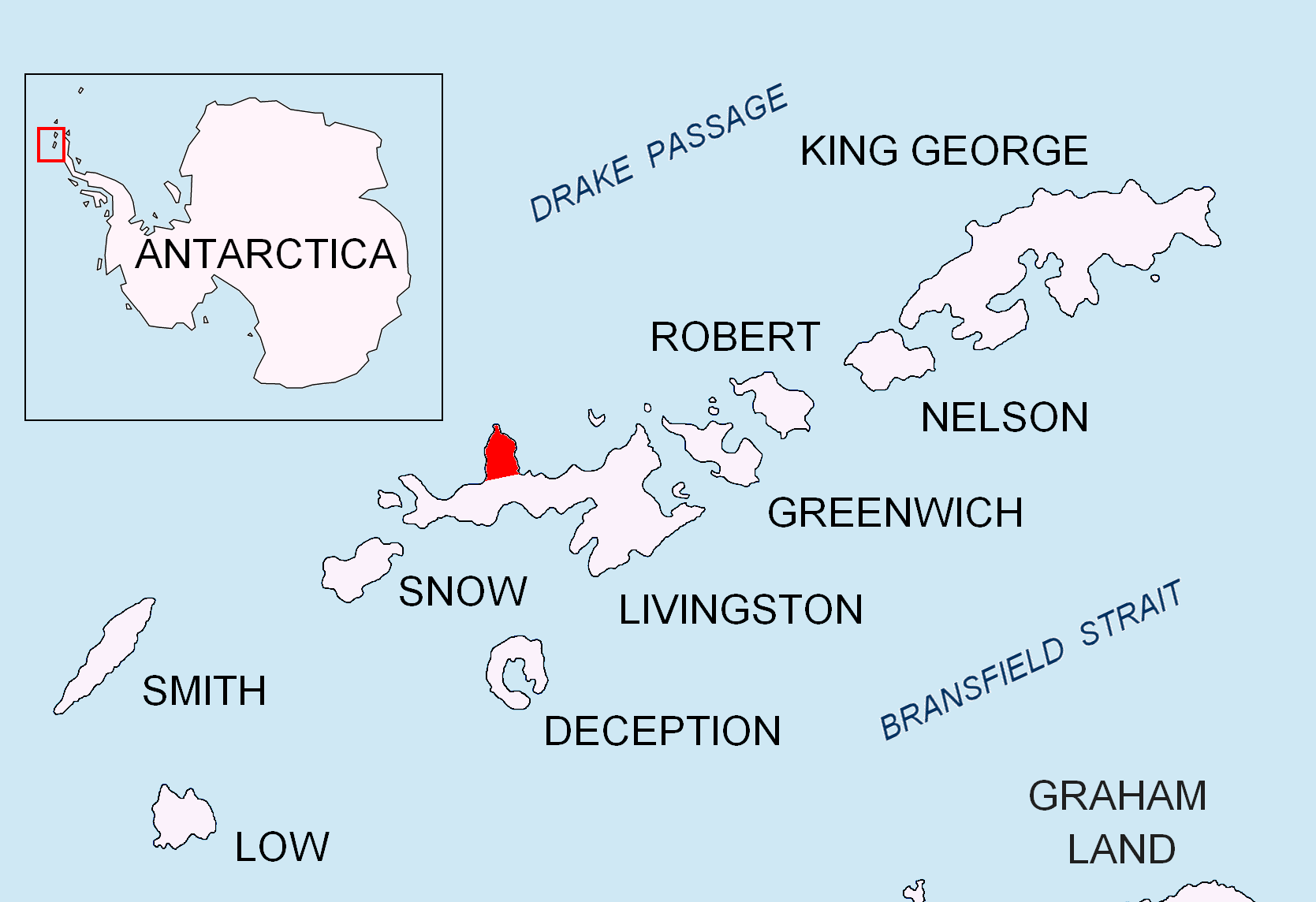
Location of Ioannes Paulus II Peninsula on Livingston Island in the South Shetland Islands.

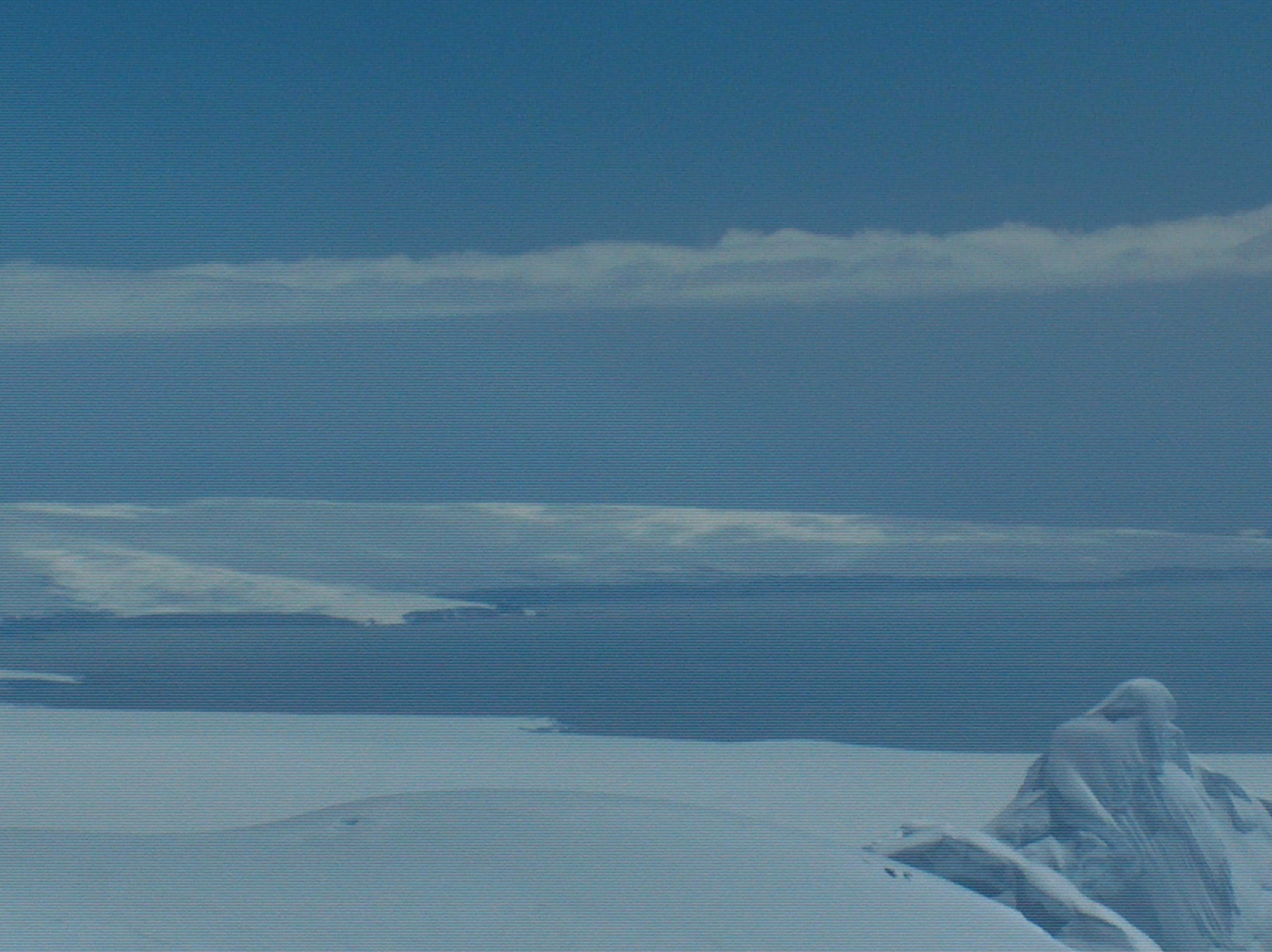
Stoyanov Cove and Ioannes Paulus II Peninsula in the background, from Catalunyan Saddle; Burdick Ridge in the foreground.

Topographic map of Livingston Island and Smith Island

Stoyanov Cove (Bulgarian: Стоянов залив, romanized: Stoyanov zaliv, IPA: [stoˈjanov ˈzalif]) is the 2.6 km wide cove indenting for 1.1 km the north coast of Livingston Island in the South Shetland Islands, Antarctica. Entered between Sandanski Point and Agüero Point on Ioannes Paulus II Peninsula. Most of the cove's coastline is formed by the terminus of Urdoviza Glacier.

The cove is named after the Bulgarian scientist Velichko Stoyanov (1932–1999) for his support for the Bulgarian Antarctic programme.

== Location ==
Stoyanov Cove is located at 62°31′28″S 60°41′55″W. British mapping in 1968, Spanish in 1991, and Bulgarian in 2005 and 2009.

== Maps ==
- L.L. Ivanov. Antarctica: Livingston Island and Greenwich, Robert, Snow and Smith Islands. Scale 1:120000 topographic map. Troyan: Manfred Wörner Foundation, 2010. ISBN 978-954-92032-9-5 (First edition 2009. ISBN 978-954-92032-6-4)
- Antarctic Digital Database (ADD). Scale 1:250000 topographic map of Antarctica. Scientific Committee on Antarctic Research (SCAR). Since 1993, regularly upgraded and updated.
- L.L. Ivanov. Antarctica: Livingston Island and Smith Island. Scale 1:100000 topographic map. Manfred Wörner Foundation, 2017. ISBN 978-619-90008-3-0
