= Sandanski (disambiguation) =

Sandanski (Bulgarian: Сандански [sɐnˈdanski]) is a town in Bulgaria. Sandanski may also refer to

- Sandanski Municipality in Bulgaria
- Yane Sandanski (1872–1915), Macedonian Bulgarian revolutionary
  - Sandanski Point in Antarctica named after Yane Sadanski
  - Jane Sandanski Arena in North Macedonia named after Yane Sadanski
- Yanko Sandanski (born 1988), Bulgarian football midfielder
