= Medven Glacier =

Glacier in Antarctica

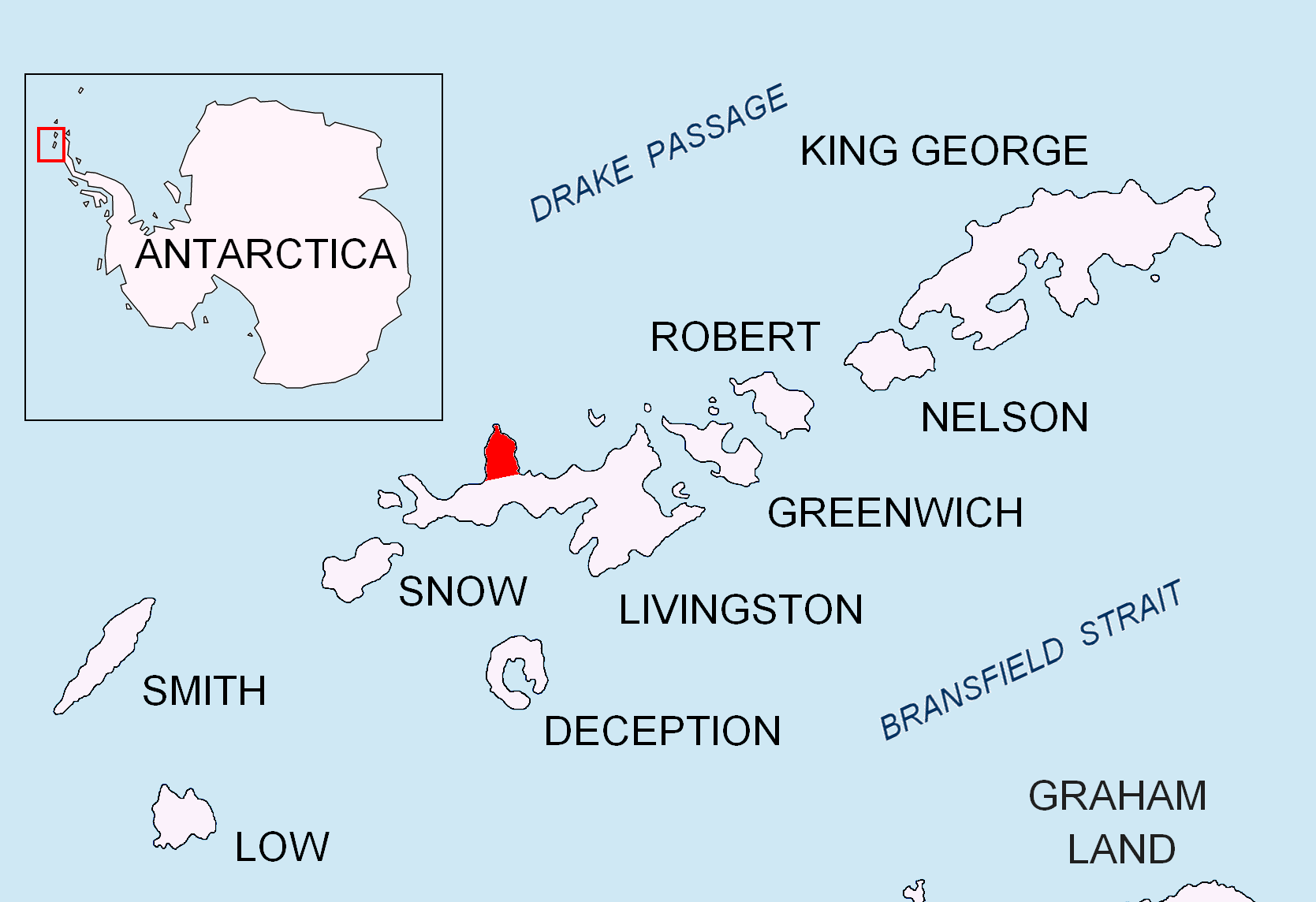
- Location of Ioannes Paulus II Peninsula on Livingston Island in the South Shetland Islands

- Location within South Shetland Islands Location within Antarctica
- Location: Livingston Island; South Shetland Islands
- Coordinates: 62°32′50″S 60°42′50″W
- Length: 1.3 nautical miles (2.4 km; 1.5 mi)
- Width: 0.8 nautical miles (1.5 km; 0.92 mi)
- Thickness: unknown
- Terminus: Prisoe Cove
- Status: unknown

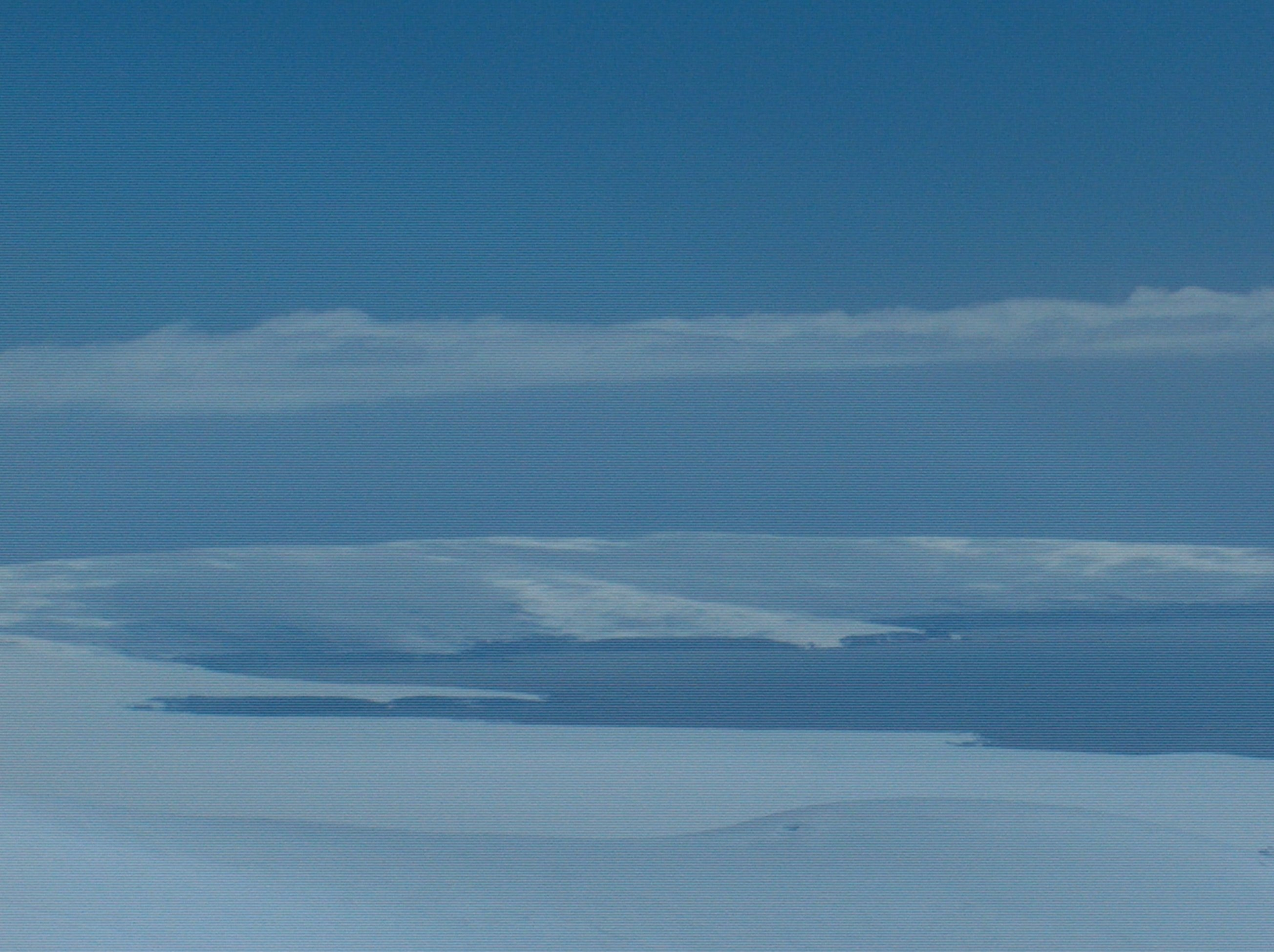
Medven Glacier from northern Friesland Ridge.

Topographic map of Livingston Island and Smith Island.

Medven Glacier (Bulgarian: ледник Медвен, romanized: lednik Medven, IPA: [ˈlɛdnik ˈmɛdvɛn]) is a 2.5 km long and 1.5 km wide glacier on Ioannes Paulus II Peninsula, Livingston Island in the South Shetland Islands, Antarctica situated east of Etar Snowfield, south of Urdoviza Glacier and north of Berkovitsa Glacier. It is bounded by the east slopes of Oryahovo Heights and drains eastwards into Prisoe Cove, Hero Bay between Remetalk Point and Agüero Point. Bulgarian mapping in 2005 and 2009.

The glacier is named after the settlement of Medven in the eastern Balkan Mountains, Bulgaria.

== Location ==
The glacier is centred at 62°32′50″S 60°42′50″W.

== See also ==
- List of glaciers in the Antarctic
- Glaciology

== Map ==
- L.L. Ivanov. Antarctica: Livingston Island and Greenwich, Robert, Snow and Smith Islands. Scale 1:120000 topographic map. Troyan: Manfred Wörner Foundation, 2009. ISBN 978-954-92032-6-4
