= Berrister Gap =

Antarctic nunatak

Location of Livingston Island in the South Shetland Islands

Berrister Gap (Bulgarian: седловина Беристър, romanized: sedlovina Berrister, IPA: [sɛdlovi'na 'bɛristər]) is the ice-covered 3.7 km long saddle of elevation 191 m on western Livingston Island in the South Shetland Islands, Antarctica, linking Casanovas Peak on the northeast to Rotch Dome on the southwest. It is part of the glacial divide between Verila Glacier on the southeast and Etar Snowfield on the northwest. The area was known to early 19th century sealers. The gap was visited by a field party from the British base camp Station P during the summer season 1957/58.

The feature is named after Andrew Berrister, a fictional scientist from Simon Beaufort’s novel The Killing Ship, who crossed the gap while running for help from Hannah Point to Barclay Bay.

== Location ==
Berrister Gap is centred at 62°36′20″S 60°46′40″W. Bulgarian mapping in 2009 and 2017.

== Maps ==
Topographic map of Livingston Island and Smith Island

- Livingston Island to King George Island. Scale 1:200000. Admiralty Nautical Chart 1776. Taunton: UK Hydrographic Office, 1968
- South Shetland Islands. Scale 1:200000 topographic map No. 3373. DOS 610 - W 62 58. Tolworth, UK, 1968
- L. Ivanov. Antarctica: Livingston Island and Greenwich, Robert, Snow and Smith Islands. Scale 1:120000 topographic map. Troyan: Manfred Wörner Foundation, 2010. ISBN 978-954-92032-9-5 (First edition 2009. ISBN 978-954-92032-6-4)
- L. Ivanov. Antarctica: Livingston Island and Smith Island. Scale 1:100000 topographic map. Manfred Wörner Foundation, 2017. ISBN 978-619-90008-3-0
- Antarctic Digital Database (ADD). Scale 1:250000 topographic map of Antarctica. Scientific Committee on Antarctic Research (SCAR). Since 1993, regularly upgraded and updated
