= Doctor Guillermo Mann Base =

Doctor Guillermo Mann Station
- Antarctic Station
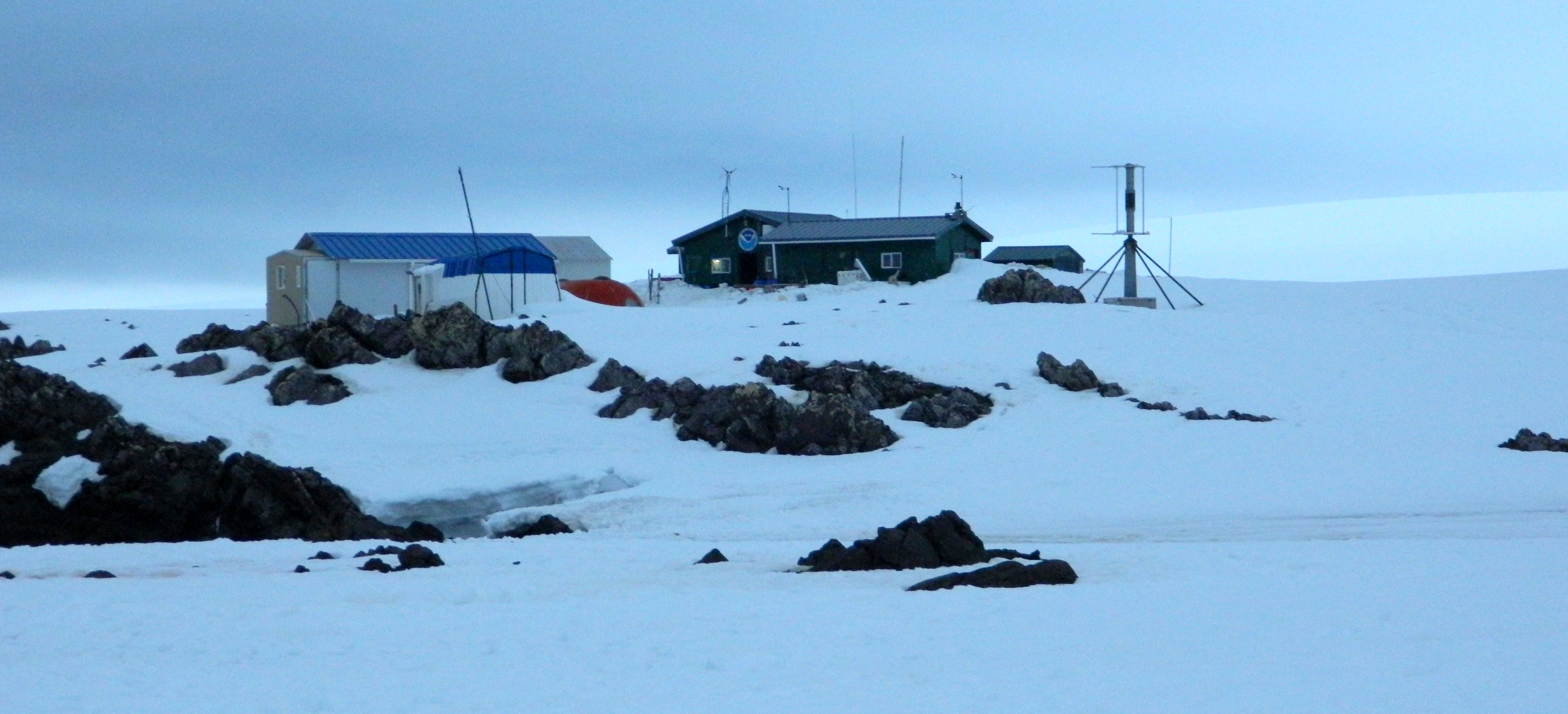
- Cape Shirreff research station with the Chilean facilities on the left and the US ones on the right

- Location of Guillermo Mann Station in Antarctica
- Coordinates: 62°28′12″S 60°46′16″W
- Country: Chile
- Location in Antarctica: Ioannes Paulus II Peninsula; Livingston Island; South Shetland Islands; Antarctica
- Administered by: Instituto Antártico Chileno INACH
- Established: November 1991
- Named for: Guillermo Mann
- Elevation: 15 m (49 ft)

Population (2017)
  - Summer: 8
  - Winter: 0
- Type: Seasonal
- Period: Summer
- Status: Closed
- Activities: List: Archaeology; Glaciology; Geology
- Website: Base Profesor Julio Escudero (INACH)

Doctor Guillermo Mann Base (formerly Camp Shirreff) is a Chilean Antarctic research base. It is located on the east side of Cape Shirreff on Ioannes Paulus II Peninsula on Livingston Island in the South Shetland Islands off the Antarctic peninsula.

It is adjacent to the Shirreff Base that is administrated by the United States.

The base is named after the Chilean zoologist, naturalist and ecologist Guillermo Mann, who participated in 1947 on the first Chilean Antarctic Expedition.

This base should not be confused with the old Doctor Guillermo Mann or Spring-INACH Base from 1973 that is located in the Spring Point, Hughes Bay. Today that base is not operational.

== See also ==
- List of Antarctic research stations
- List of Antarctic field camps
