= Shirreff Base =

- Antarctic base
- Holt Watters Field Camp
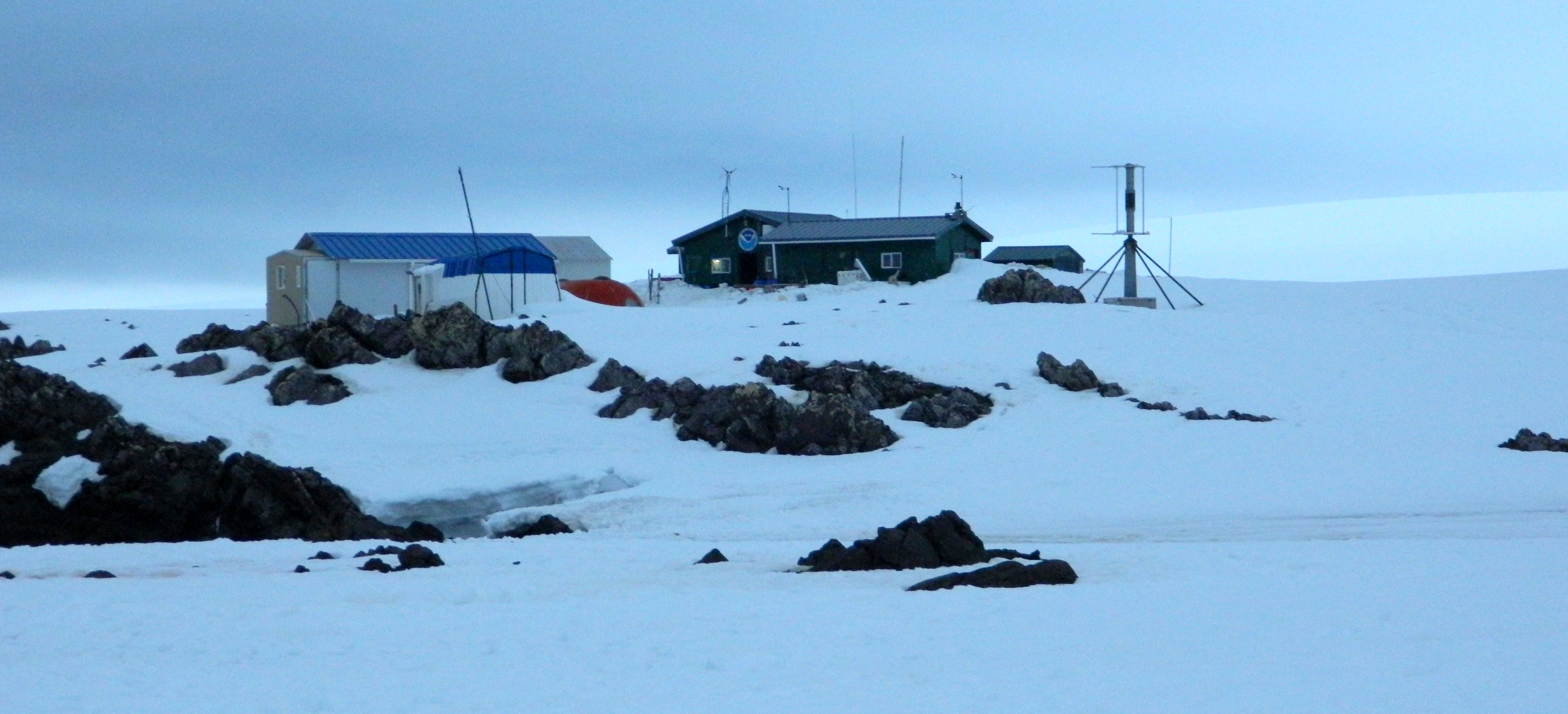
- The original Cape Shirreff research station with the Chilean facilities on the left and the US ones on the right

- Location of Shirreff Base in Antarctica
- Coordinates: 62°28′12″S 60°46′17″W
- Country: United States
- Location in Antarctica: Ioannes Paulus II Peninsula; Livingston Island; South Shetland Islands; Antarctica
- Established: 1996; 30 years ago

Population
  - Summer: 6
  - Winter: 0
- Type: Seasonal
- Period: Summer
- Status: Operational
- Activities: Pinniped monitoring

Shirreff Base (original name Cape Shirreff Field Station) is a seasonal field station in the Southern Ocean operated by the U.S. National Oceanic and Atmospheric Administration (NOAA) and opened in 1996. It is situated on the east side of Cape Shirreff on Ioannes Paulus II Peninsula on Livingston Island in the South Shetland Islands off the Antarctic peninsula.

In January 2023 as the station was being rebuilt, it was renamed the Holt Watters Field Camp recognizing directors Rennie Holt and George Watters of NOAA's Antarctic Ecosystem Research Division (AERD).

It is adjacent to the Chilean base called Doctor Guillermo Mann.

== Location ==
The base is located 1.58 km southeast of Cape Shirreff and 3.32 km west-northwest of Black Point (detailed Chilean mapping in 2004. Bulgarian mapping in 2005 and 2009).

== Maps ==
- L.L. Ivanov et al., Antarctica: Livingston Island and Greenwich Island, South Shetland Islands (from English Strait to Morton Strait, with illustrations and ice-cover distribution), 1:100000 scale topographic map, Antarctic Place-names Commission of Bulgaria, Sofia, 2005.
- L.L. Ivanov. Antarctica: Livingston Island and Greenwich, Robert, Snow and Smith Islands. Scale 1:120000 topographic map. Troyan: Manfred Wörner Foundation, 2010. ISBN 978-954-92032-9-5 (First edition 2009. ISBN 978-954-92032-6-4)
- Antarctic Digital Database (ADD). Scale 1:250000 topographic map of Antarctica. Scientific Committee on Antarctic Research (SCAR), 1993–2016.

== See also ==
- List of research stations in Antarctica
- Antarctic field camps
