= Frederick Rocks =

Group of rocks in the South Shetland Islands, Antarctica

Geography
- Location: Antarctica
- Coordinates: 62°32′46.5″S 60°55′59.7″W
- Archipelago: South Shetland Islands

Administration
- Antarctica
- Administered under the Antarctic Treaty System

Demographics
- Population: uninhabited

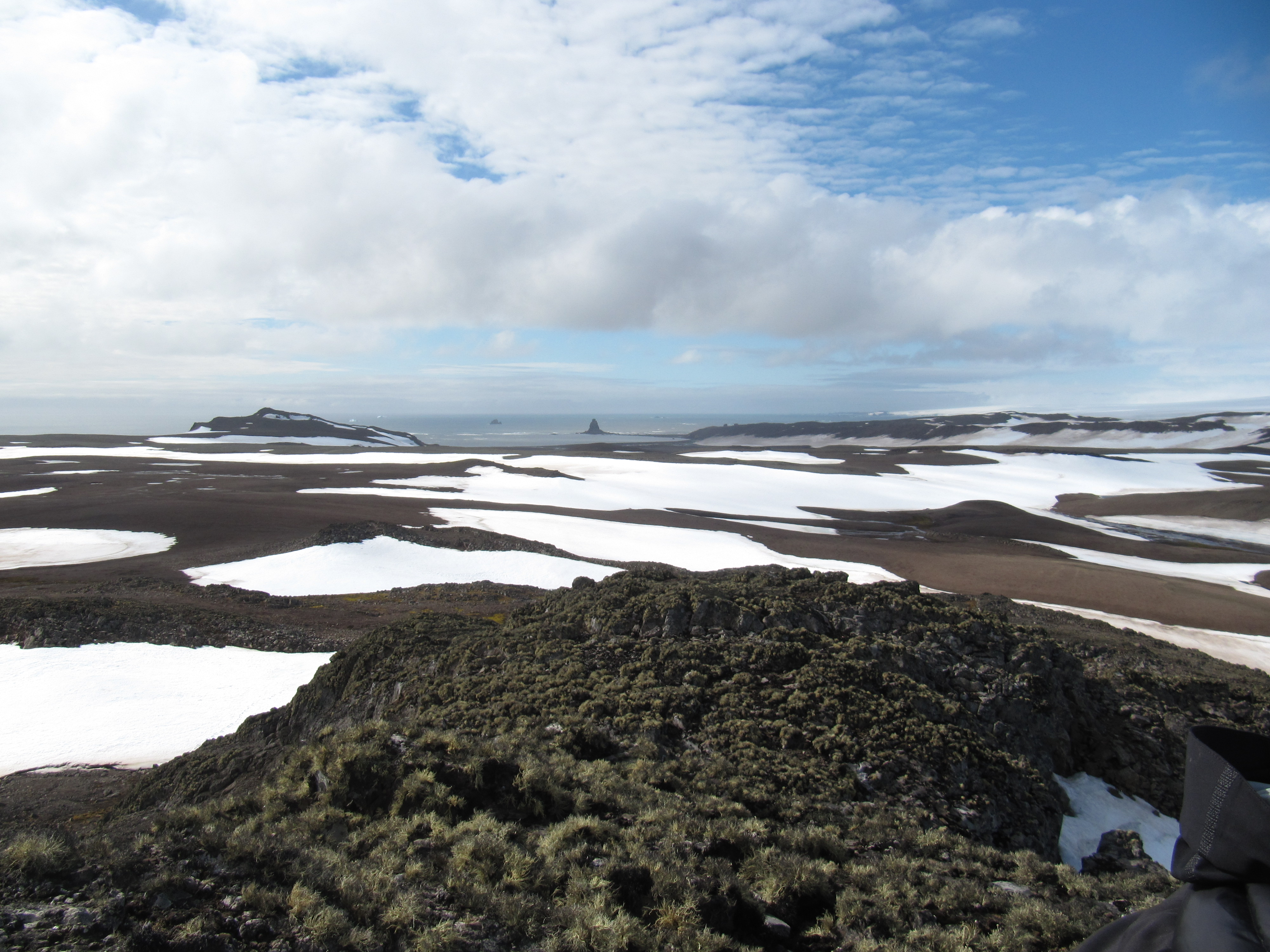
Robbery Beaches and Barclay Bay from near Basalt Lake on Byers Peninsula, Livingston Island, with left to right Lair Point, Frederick Rocks, Cutler Stack, Nedelya Point and the northern part of Urvich Wall in the middle ground, and Cape Shirreff and Ioannes Paulus II Peninsula in the right background

Topographic map of Livingston Island, Greenwich, Robert, Snow and Smith Islands

Frederick Rocks is a group of rocks lying in Barclay Bay on the north side of Livingston Island in the South Shetland Islands, Antarctica. The area was visited by early 19th century sealers operating on nearby Byers Peninsula.

The feature is named after the American brig Frederick under Captain Benjamin Pendleton that visited the South Shetlands in 1820-21 and 1821–22.

== Location ==
The rocks are located at 62°32′46.5″S 60°55′59.7″W which is 12.24 km (7.61 mi)southwest of Cape Shirreff, 4.69 km (2.91 mi) west-southwest of Scesa Point, 5.28 km (3.28 mi) west-northwest of Rowe Point and 13.3 km (8.26 mi) east-northeast of Essex Point (British mapping in 1968, Chilean in 1971, Argentine in 1980, and Bulgarian in 2009).

== See also ==
- Composite Antarctic Gazetteer
- List of Antarctic islands south of 60° S
- SCAR
- Territorial claims in Antarctica

== Maps ==
- L.L. Ivanov. Antarctica: Livingston Island and Greenwich, Robert, Snow and Smith Islands. Scale 1:120000 topographic map. Troyan: Manfred Wörner Foundation, 2009. ISBN 978-954-92032-6-4
