= Agüero Point =

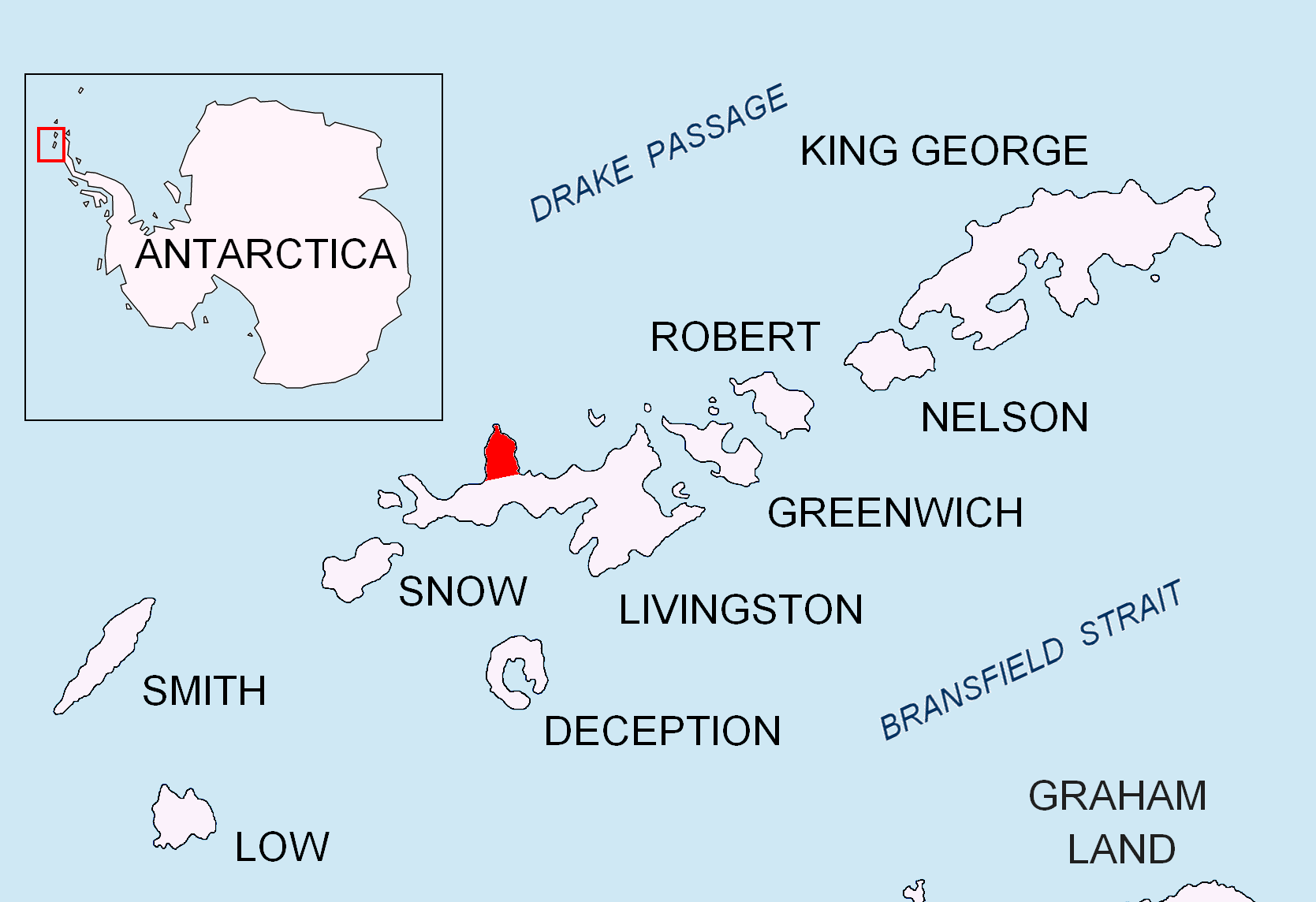
Location of Ioannes Paulus II Peninsula on Livingston Island in the South Shetland Islands

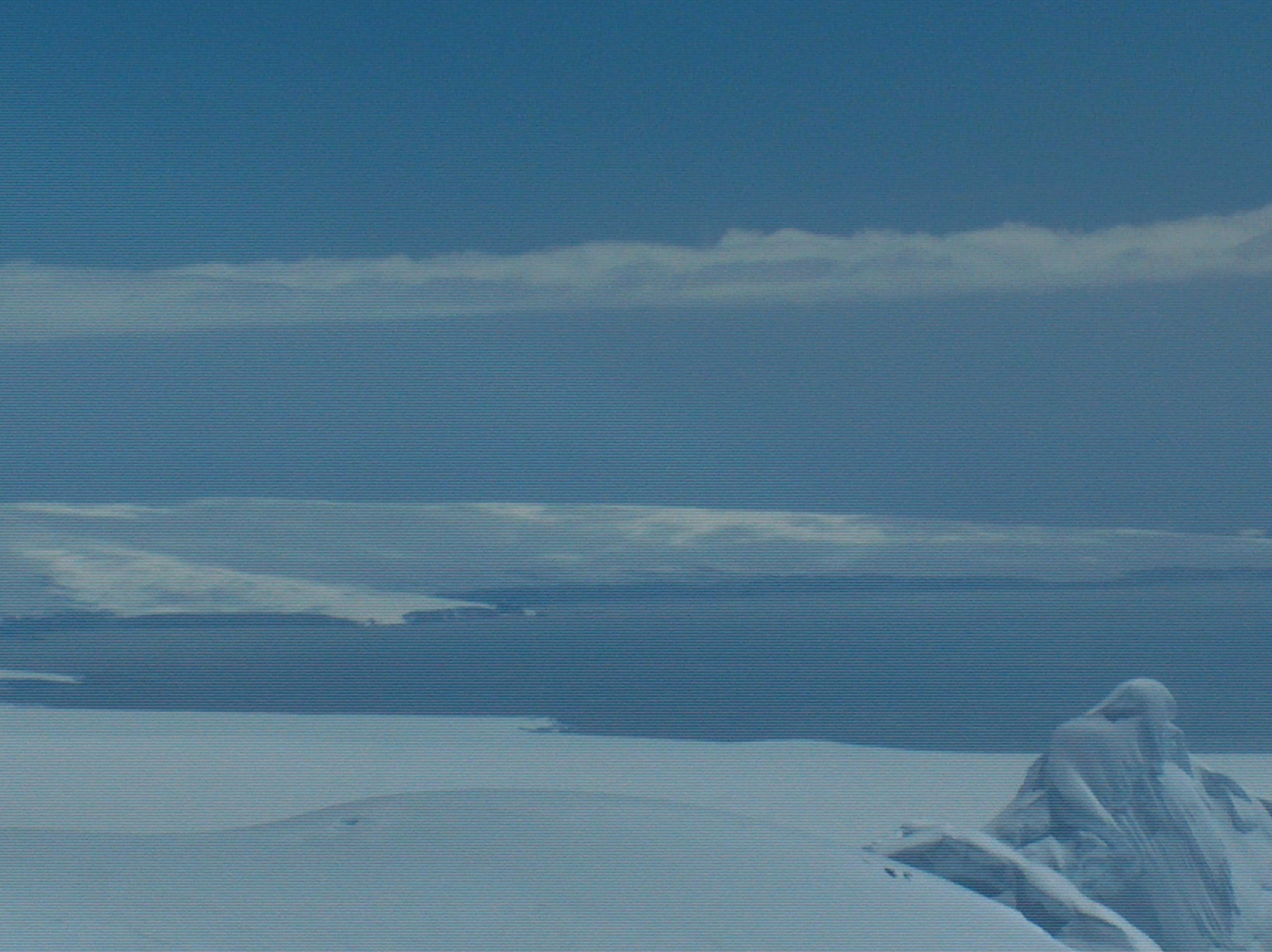
Agüero Point (on the left) and Ioannes Paulus II Peninsula in the background, from Catalunyan Saddle; Burdick Ridge in the foreground

Topographic map of Livingston Island and Smith Island

Agüero Point is the southeast extremity of a trapezoid-shaped and mostly ice-covered headland projecting 900 m from the east coast of Ioannes Paulus II Peninsula into Hero Bay, Livingston Island in the South Shetland Islands, Antarctica. The point forms the north side of the entrance to Prisoe Cove and, together with nearby Arroyo Point, separates the termini of Urdoviza Glacier to the north from Medven Glacier to the south.

The feature is named after Clodomiro Agüero Soto, a crewman of the Chilean naval vessel Yelcho which rescued the Ernest Shackleton's expedition fellows members from Elephant Island in 1916.

== Location ==
The point is located at 62°32′28.5″S 60°40′43.3″W which is 850 m south-southeast of Arroyo Point, 6.4 km south by east of Black Point and 4 km northwest of Avitohol Point (British mapping in 1968, Chilean in 1971, Argentine in 1980, Spanish in 1991, and Bulgarian in 2005, 2009 and 2017).

== See also ==
- Ioannes Paulus II Peninsula
- Livingston Island

== Maps ==
- L. Ivanov et al. Antarctica: Livingston Island and Greenwich Island, South Shetland Islands. Scale 1:100000 topographic map. Sofia: Antarctic Place-names Commission of Bulgaria, 2005.
- L. Ivanov. Antarctica: Livingston Island and Greenwich, Robert, Snow and Smith Islands. Scale 1:120000 topographic map. Troyan: Manfred Wörner Foundation, 2009. ISBN 978-954-92032-6-4
- L. Ivanov. Antarctica: Livingston Island and Smith Island. Scale 1:100000 topographic map. Manfred Wörner Foundation, 2017. ISBN 978-619-90008-3-0
