= Etar Snowfield =

Roughly crescent-shaped snowfield in the South Shetland Islands, Antarctica

Location of Livingston Island in the South Shetland Islands.

Topographic map of Livingston Island and Smith Island

Etar Snowfield (Bulgarian: Ледник Етър, romanized: lednik Etar, IPA: [ˈlɛdnik ˈɛtɐr]) is a roughly crescent-shaped snowfield on western Livingston Island in the South Shetland Islands, Antarctica situated west of Urdoviza, Medven and Berkovitsa Glaciers, northwest of Verila Glacier, east of Ivanov Beach and south of Gerlovo Beach. It drains the west slopes of Oryahovo Heights and the north slopes of Rotch Dome, and flows into Barclay Bay between Mercury Bluff and Rowe Point. The feature extends 5 km (3 mi) inland, and 15 km (9 mi) in south-southwest to north-northeast direction.

The glacier was named after the settlement of Etar in the central Balkan Mountains, Bulgaria.

== Location ==
The snowfield is centred at 62°34′07″S 60°46′27″W. Bulgarian mapping in 2005, 2009 and 2017.

== Maps ==
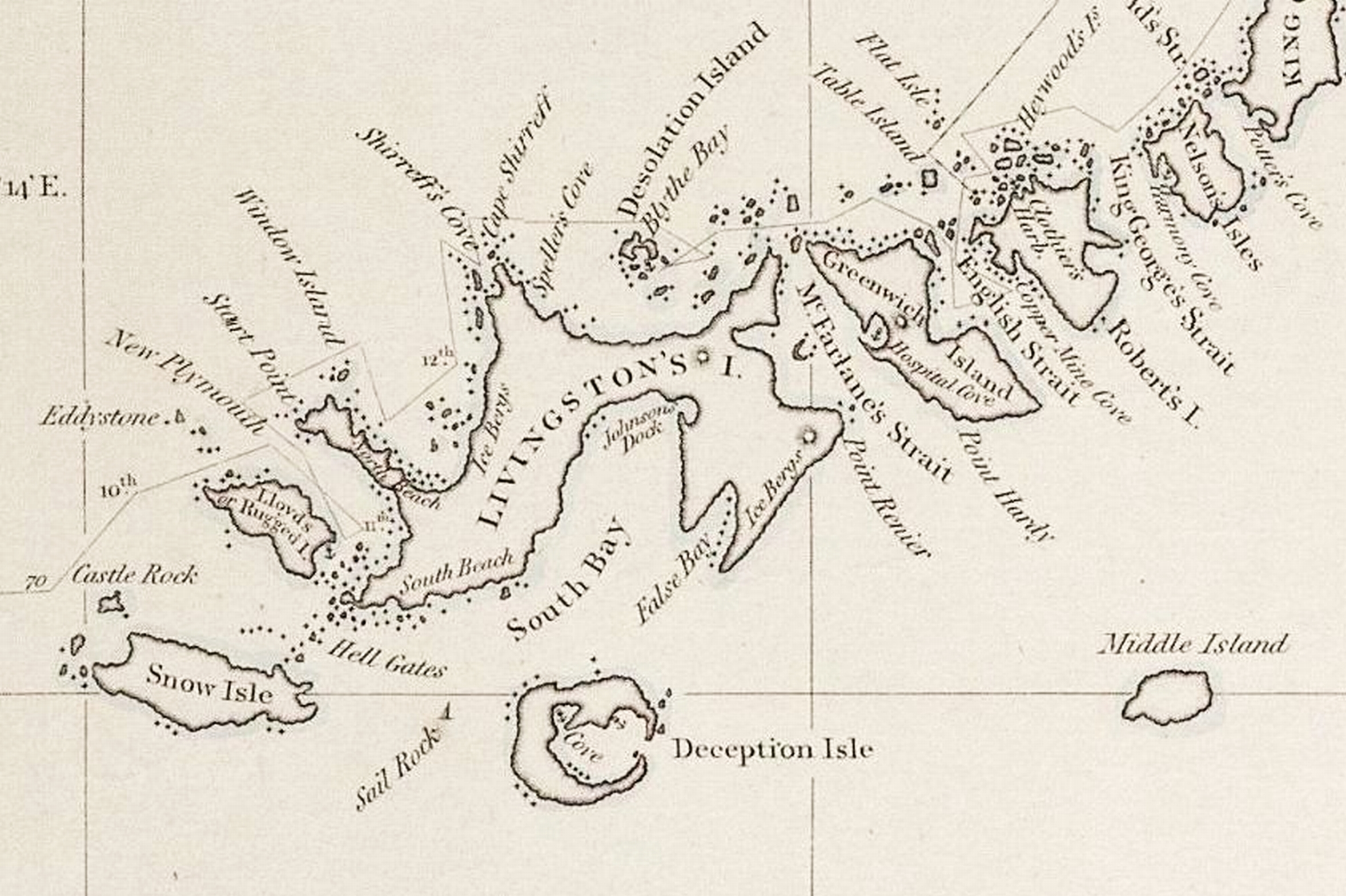
Fragment of George Powell's 1822 chart of the South Shetland Islands and South Orkney Islands featuring Etar Snowfield area

- Chart of South Shetland including Coronation Island, &c. from the exploration of the sloop Dove in the years 1821 and 1822 by George Powell Commander of the same. Scale ca. 1:200000. London: Laurie, 1822
- L.L. Ivanov et al. Antarctica: Livingston Island and Greenwich Island, South Shetland Islands. Scale 1:100000 topographic map. Sofia: Antarctic Place-names Commission of Bulgaria, 2005.
- L.L. Ivanov. Antarctica: Livingston Island and Greenwich, Robert, Snow and Smith Islands. Scale 1:120000 topographic map. Troyan: Manfred Wörner Foundation, 2010. ISBN 978-954-92032-9-5 (First edition 2009. ISBN 978-954-92032-6-4)
- Antarctic Digital Database (ADD). Scale 1:250000 topographic map of Antarctica. Scientific Committee on Antarctic Research (SCAR). Since 1993, regularly upgraded and updated.
- L.L. Ivanov. Antarctica: Livingston Island and Smith Island. Scale 1:100000 topographic map. Manfred Wörner Foundation, 2017. ISBN 978-619-90008-3-0

== In fiction ==
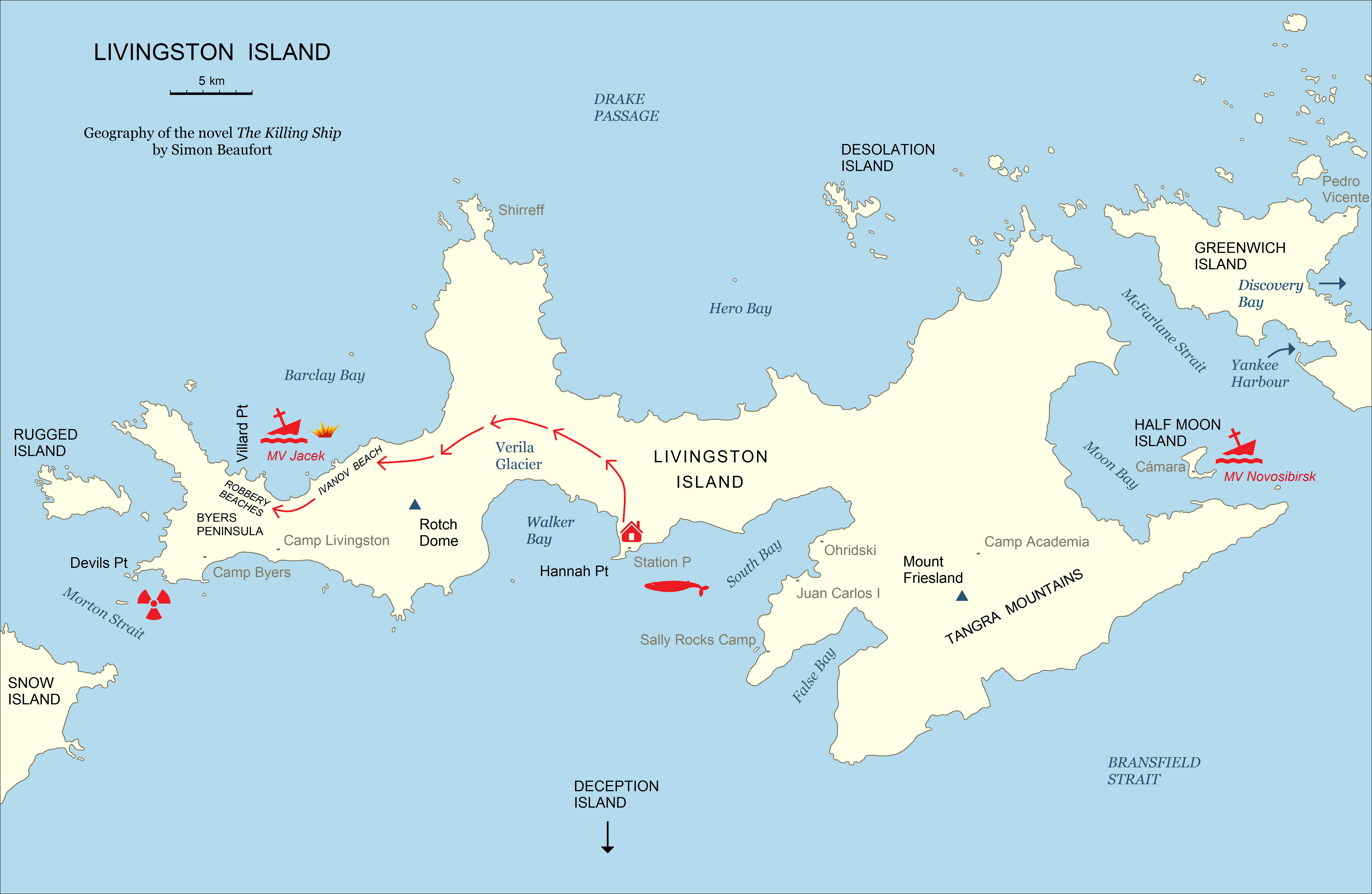
Geography of the thriller novel The Killing Ship by Simon Beaufort

- The snowfield contributes to the mise-en-scène of the 2016 Antarctica thriller novel The Killing Ship authored by Elizabeth Cruwys and Beau Riffenburgh (under their joint alias Simon Beaufort), with action spreading from Hannah Point to Byers Peninsula via Ivanov Beach, skirting Verila Glacier and Etar Snowfield in the process.
