= Berkovitsa Glacier =

Glacier in Antarctica

- Location of Livingston Island in the South Shetland Islands

- Location within South Shetland Islands Location within Antarctica
- Location: Livingston Island
- Coordinates: 62°34′20″S 60°41′15″W
- Length: 4 km (2.5 mi)
- Thickness: unknown
- Terminus: Hero Bay
- Status: unknown

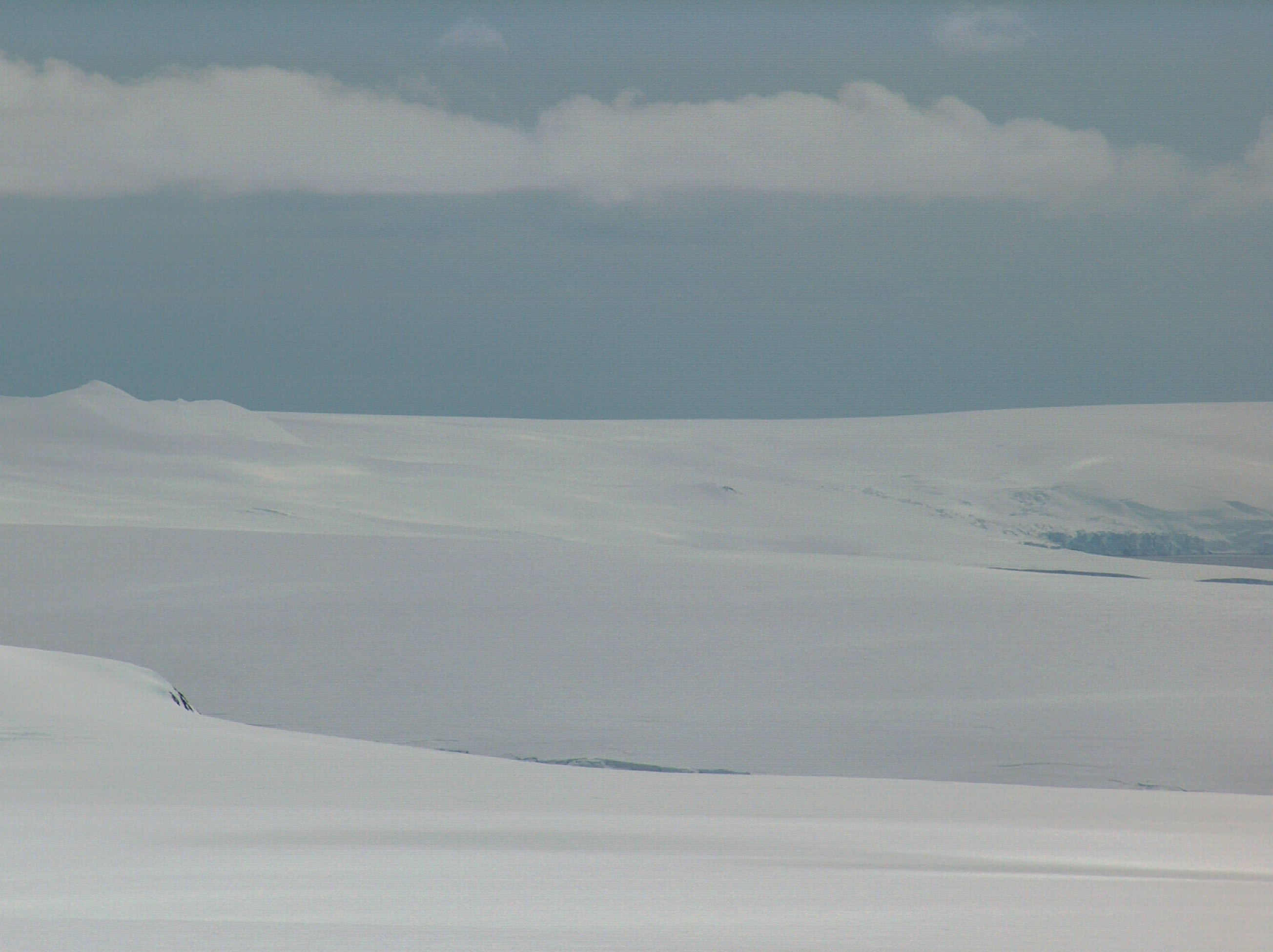
Berkovitsa Glacier (in the background) from Kuzman Knoll

Topographic map of Livingston Island and Smith Island

Berkovitsa Glacier (Bulgarian: ледник Берковица, romanized: lednik Berkovitsa, IPA: [ˈlɛdniɡ berˈkɔvit͡sɐ]) is a glacier on Livingston Island, Antarctica situated east of Etar Snowfield, south of Medven Glacier, west-northwest of Tundzha Glacier and north-northeast of Verila Glacier. It is bounded by the southeastern slopes of Oryahovo Heights and the northwestern slopes of Snow Peak. It extends 4 km in southeast-northwest direction and 2.8 km in northwest-southeast direction, and drains northeastwards into Hero Bay between Avitohol Point and Remetalk Point.

The glacier is named after the town of Berkovitsa in the western Balkan Mountains, Bulgaria.

== Location ==
The glacier is centred at 62°34′20″S 60°41′15″W. Bulgarian mapping in 2005 and 2009.

== See also ==
- List of glaciers in the Antarctic
- Glaciology

== Maps ==
- L.L. Ivanov et al. Antarctica: Livingston Island and Greenwich Island, South Shetland Islands. Scale 1:100000 topographic map. Sofia: Antarctic Place-names Commission of Bulgaria, 2005.
- L.L. Ivanov. Antarctica: Livingston Island and Greenwich, Robert, Snow and Smith Islands. Scale 1:120000 topographic map. Troyan: Manfred Wörner Foundation, 2009.
