= Hero Bay =

Bay of the South Shetland Islands

Location of Livingston Island in the South Shetland Islands.

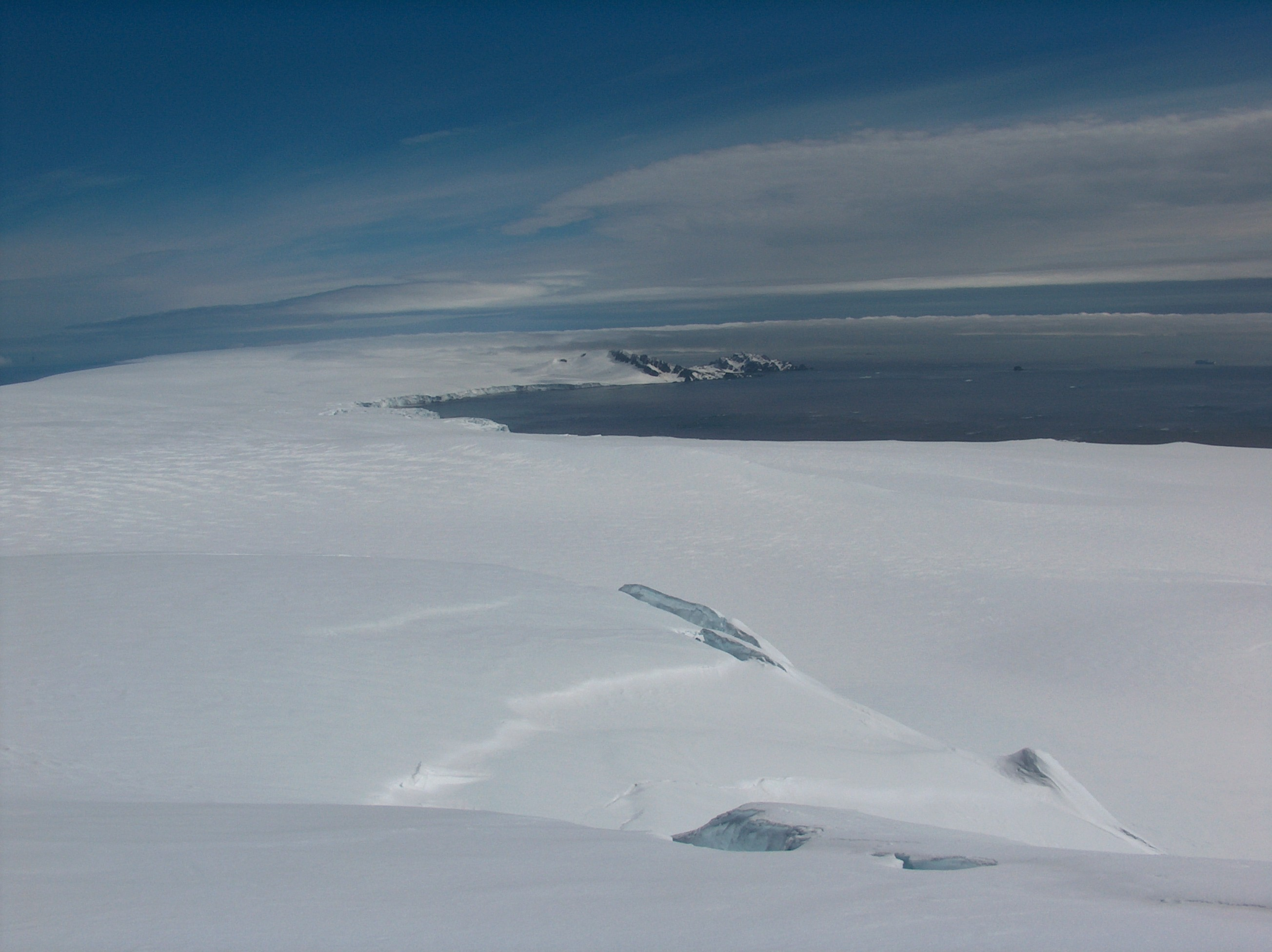
Hero Bay from Miziya Peak.

Topographic map of Livingston Island.

Hero Bay (62°31′S 60°27′W) is a bay, 17 nautical miles (31 km) wide, which indents for 6 nautical miles (11 km) the northern side of Livingston Island between Cape Shirreff and Williams Point, in the South Shetland Islands. The glaciers Saedinenie Snowfield, Tundzha, Berkovitsa, Medven and Urdoviza feed the bay.

The name "Blythe Bay", originally applied to a small bay on the southeast side of Desolation Island on George Powell's chart of 1822 published by Richard Holmes Laurie, was erroneously transferred to this bay in the 1930s. This error has now been rectified, and a new name approved for the feature here described. Hero Bay is named for the American sloop Hero, under Captain Nathaniel B. Palmer, which was one of the vessels of the Pendleton sealing fleet from Stonington, Connecticut, which visited the South Shetland Islands in 1820–21.

== Maps ==
- Chart of South Shetland including Coronation Island, &c. from the exploration of the sloop Dove in the years 1821 and 1822 by George Powell, Commander of the same. Scale ca. 1:200000. London: Laurie, 1822.
- South Shetland Islands. Scale 1:200000 topographic map No. 5657. DOS 610 – W 62 60. Tolworth, UK, 1968.
- Islas Livingston y Decepción. Mapa topográfico a escala 1:100000. Madrid: Servicio Geográfico del Ejército, 1991.
- L.L. Ivanov et al., Antarctica: Livingston Island and Greenwich Island, South Shetland Islands (from English Strait to Morton Strait, with illustrations and ice-cover distribution), 1:100000 scale topographic map, Antarctic Place-names Commission of Bulgaria, Sofia, 2005
- L.L. Ivanov. Antarctica: Livingston Island and Greenwich, Robert, Snow and Smith Islands. Scale 1:120000 topographic map. Troyan: Manfred Wörner Foundation, 2010. ISBN 978-954-92032-9-5 (First edition 2009. ISBN 978-954-92032-6-4)
- Antarctic Digital Database (ADD). Scale 1:250000 topographic map of Antarctica. Scientific Committee on Antarctic Research (SCAR), 1993–2016.
