= Oryahovo Heights =

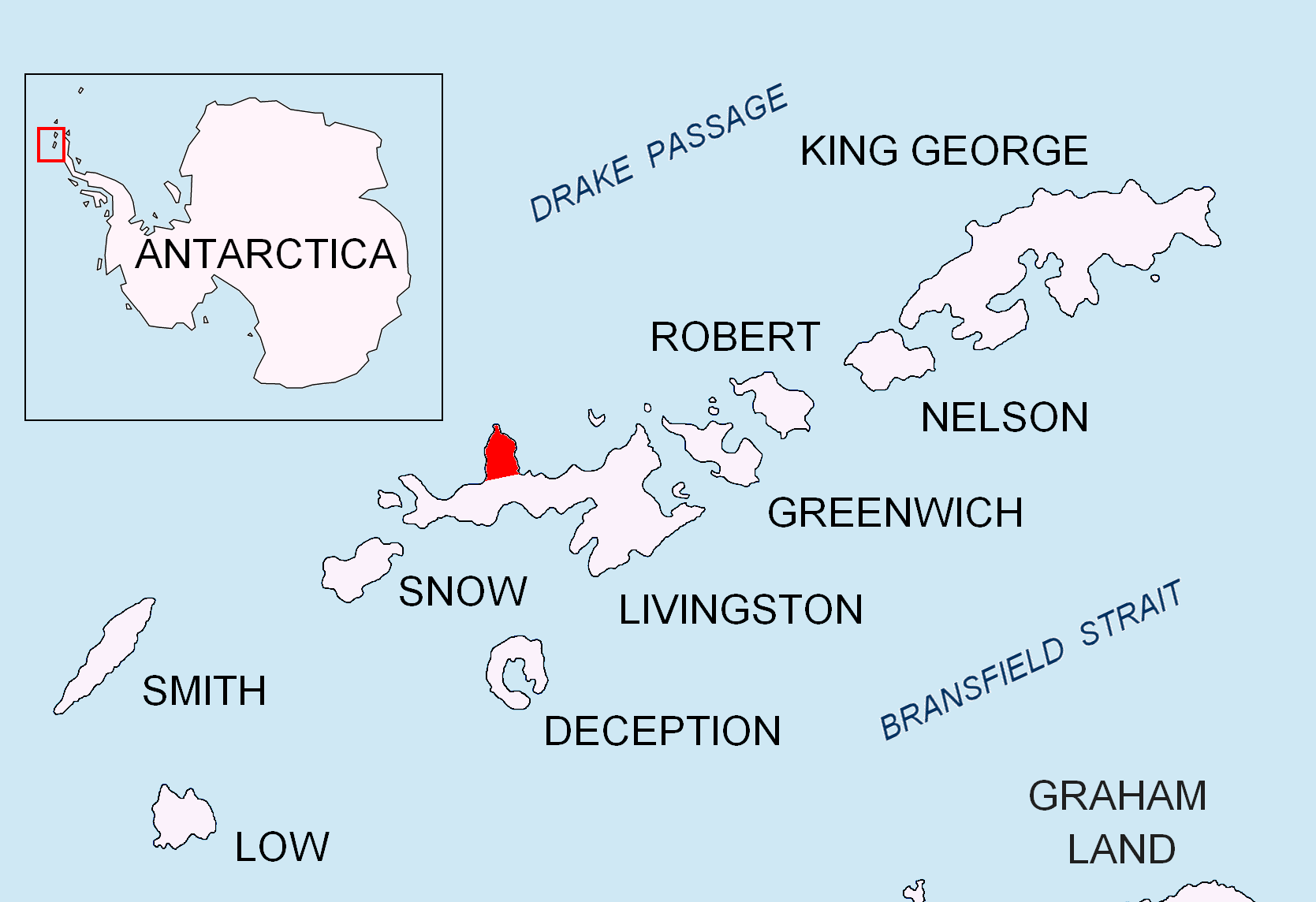
Location of Ioannes Paulus II Peninsula on Livingston Island in the South Shetland Islands.

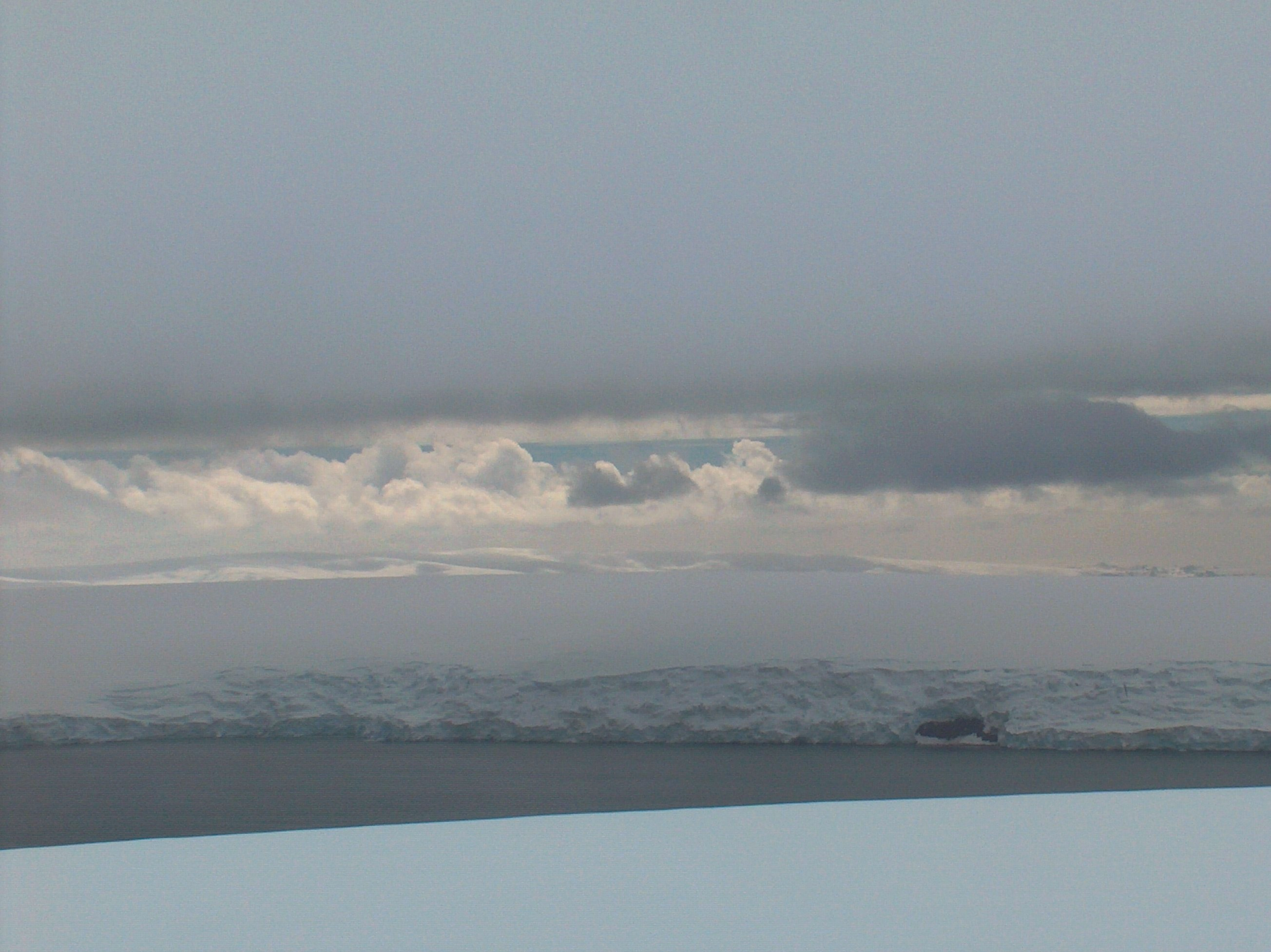
Oryahovo Heights (in the background) from Balkan Snowfield.

Topographic map of Livingston Island

Oryahovo Heights (Oryahovski Vazvisheniya \o-'rya-hov-ski v&-zvi-'she-ni-ya\) are the ice-covered heights of elevation 340 m extending 6 km in north–south direction in central and eastern Ioannes Paulus II Peninsula, Livingston Island in the South Shetland Islands, Antarctica. They are linked to Snow Peak to the southeast by two saddles separated by the small ice dome of Casanovas Peak described by Àlex S.Casanovas from the Spanish Antarctic Programme in the 2000/01 austral summer. The heights were visited by a field party from the British base camp Station P during the summer season 1957/58.

They are named after the town of Oryahovo in northwestern Bulgaria.

== Location ==
The heights are centered at 62°32′09″S 60°45′00″W (British mapping in 1963 and 1968, Bulgarian in 2009).

== Maps ==
- L.L. Ivanov et al. Antarctica: Livingston Island and Greenwich Island, South Shetland Islands. Scale 1:100000 topographic map. Sofia: Antarctic Place-names Commission of Bulgaria, 2005.
- L.L. Ivanov. Antarctica: Livingston Island and Greenwich, Robert, Snow and Smith Islands. Scale 1:120000 topographic map. Troyan: Manfred Wörner Foundation, 2009. ISBN 978-954-92032-6-4
- Antarctic Digital Database (ADD). Scale 1:250000 topographic map of Antarctica. Scientific Committee on Antarctic Research (SCAR). Since 1993, regularly upgraded and updated.
- L.L. Ivanov. Antarctica: Livingston Island and Smith Island. Scale 1:100000 topographic map. Manfred Wörner Foundation, 2017. ISBN 978-619-90008-3-0
