= Ioannes Paulus II Peninsula =

Peninsula on Livingston Island, Antarctica

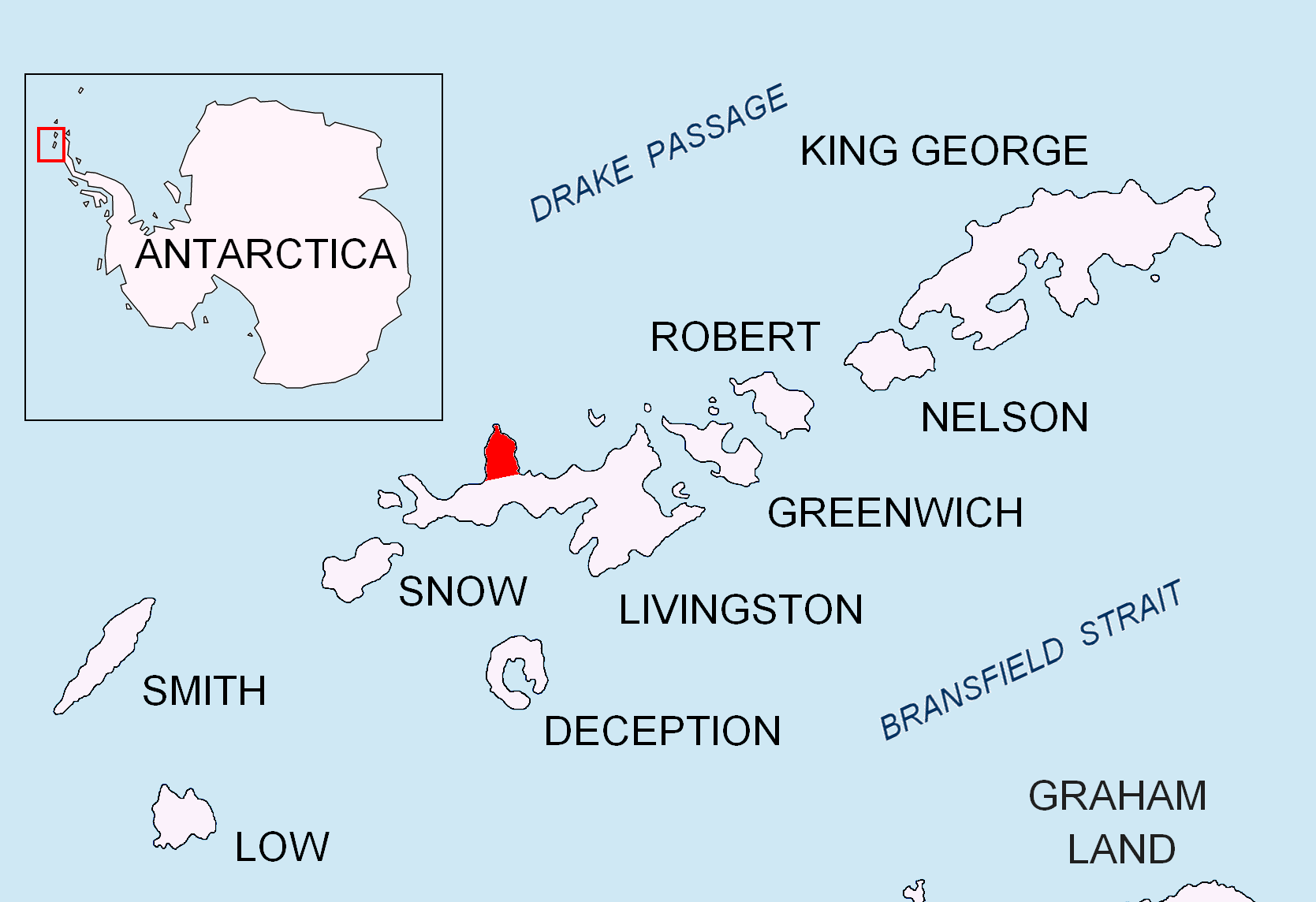
Location of Ioannes Paulus II Peninsula on Livingston Island in the South Shetland Islands

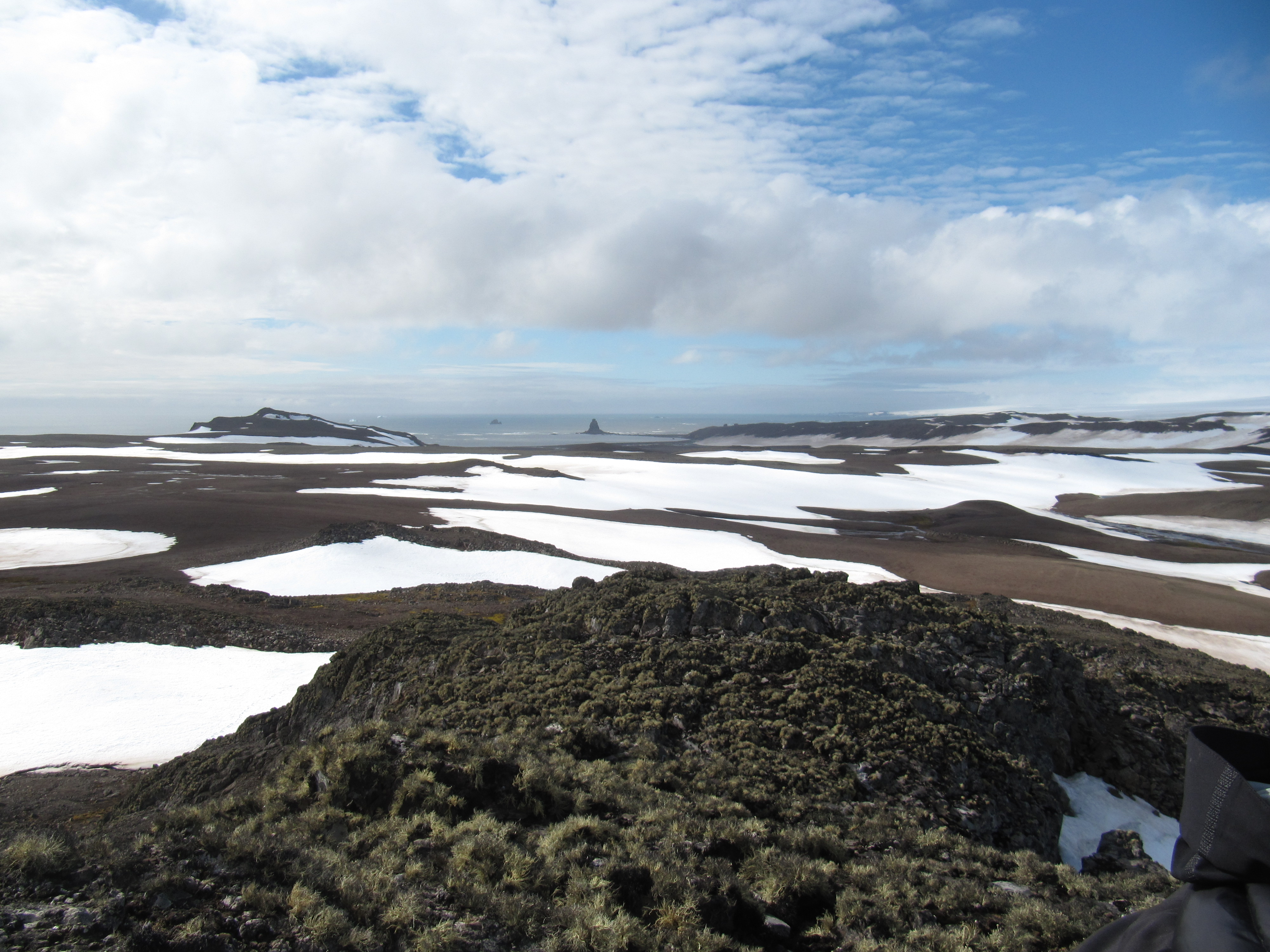
Barclay Bay and Robbery Beaches from near Basalt Lake on Byers Peninsula, Livingston Island, with left to right Lair Point, Frederick Rocks, Cutler Stack, Nedelya Point and the northern part of Urvich Wall in the middle ground, and Cape Shirreff and Ioannes Paulus II Peninsula in the right background

Ioannes Paulus II Peninsula (Bulgarian: Полуостров Йоан Павел II, romanized: Poluostrov Yoan Pavel II, IPA: [poɫuˈɔstrof joˈan ˈpavɛɫ ˈftɔri]) is an ice-covered peninsula on the north coast of Livingston Island in the South Shetland Islands, Antarctica that is bounded by Hero Bay to the east and Barclay Bay to the west. It extends 13 km in length in south–north direction and is 8 km wide. Its north extremity is formed by the ice-free Cape Shirreff, an area visited by early 19th century sealers. The peninsula's interior is occupied by Oryahovo Heights.

The feature is named after Pope John Paul II (1920–2005) for his contribution to world peace and understanding among people.

== Location ==
The peninsula is located at 62°31′43″S 60°45′58″W (British mapping in 1822 and 1968, Chilean in 1971, Argentine in 1980, Spanish mapping in 1991, and Bulgarian topographic survey Tangra 2004/05 and mapping in 2005, 2009 and 2017).

== See also ==
- Oryahovo Heights
- Cape Shirreff
- Porlier Bay
- Livingston Island

== Maps ==
- L.L. Ivanov et al. Antarctica: Livingston Island and Greenwich Island, South Shetland Islands. Scale 1:100000 topographic map. Sofia: Antarctic Place-names Commission of Bulgaria, 2005.
- L.L. Ivanov. Antarctica: Livingston Island and Greenwich, Robert, Snow and Smith Islands. Scale 1:120000 topographic map. Troyan: Manfred Wörner Foundation, 2010. ISBN 978-954-92032-9-5 (First edition 2009. ISBN 978-954-92032-6-4)
- Antarctic Digital Database (ADD). Scale 1:250000 topographic map of Antarctica. Scientific Committee on Antarctic Research (SCAR). Since 1993, regularly upgraded and updated.
- L.L. Ivanov. Antarctica: Livingston Island and Smith Island. Scale 1:100000 topographic map. Manfred Wörner Foundation, 2017. ISBN 978-619-90008-3-0

== Gallery ==
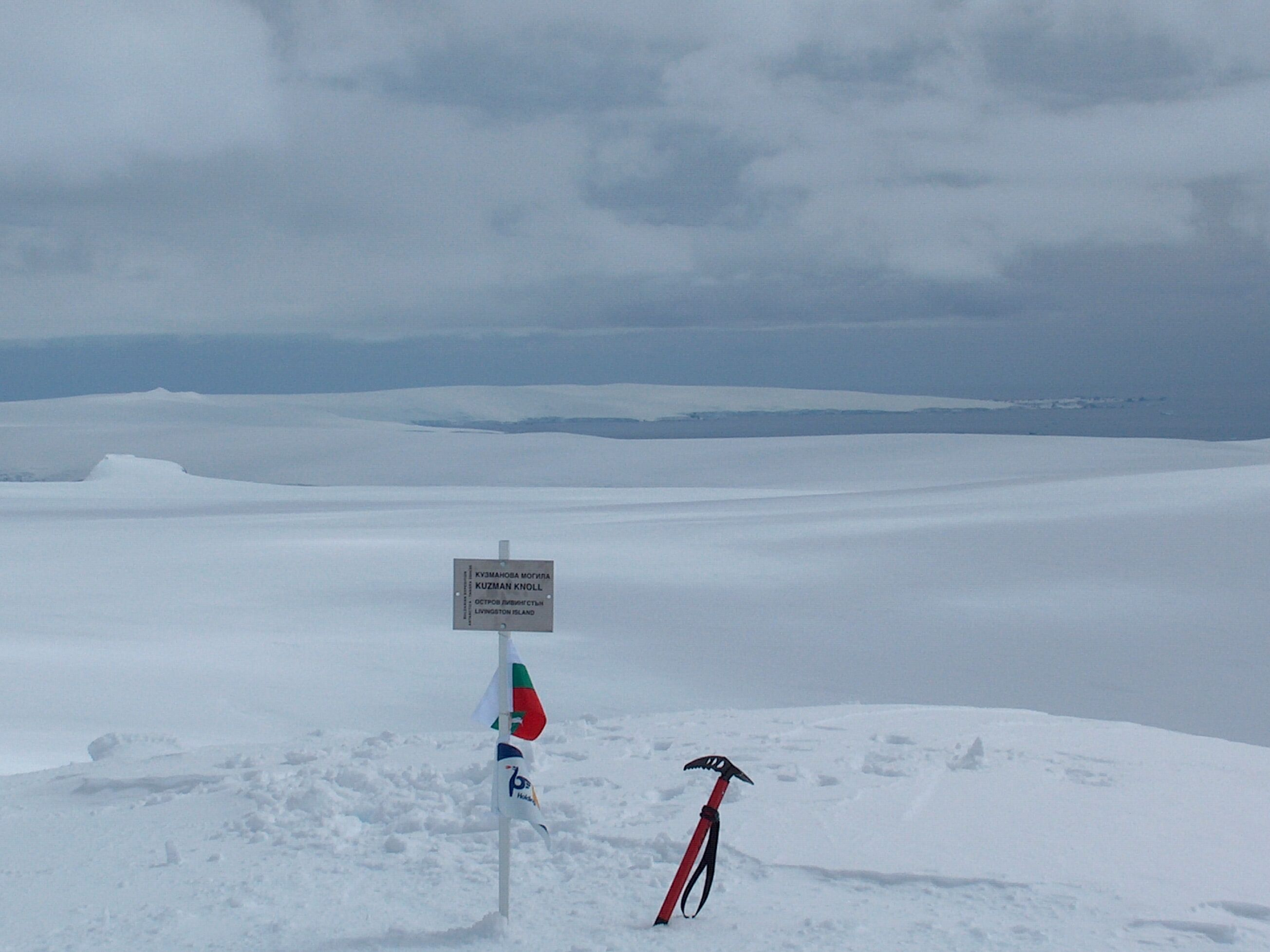
Ioannes Paulus II Peninsula (in the background) from Kuzman Knoll

Topographic map of Livingston Island

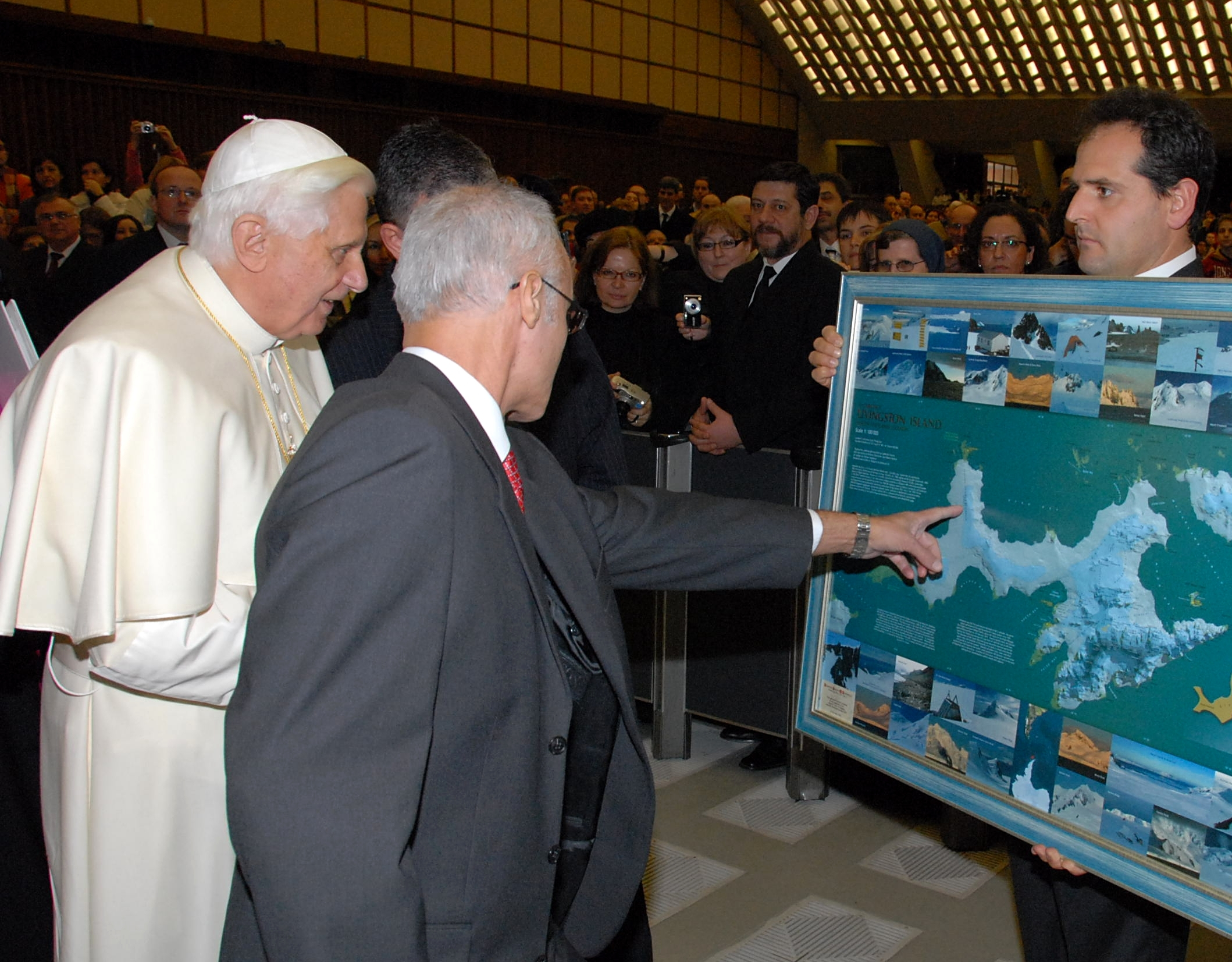
H.H. Benedict XVI views the peninsula on a 2005 Bulgarian map of Livingston Island

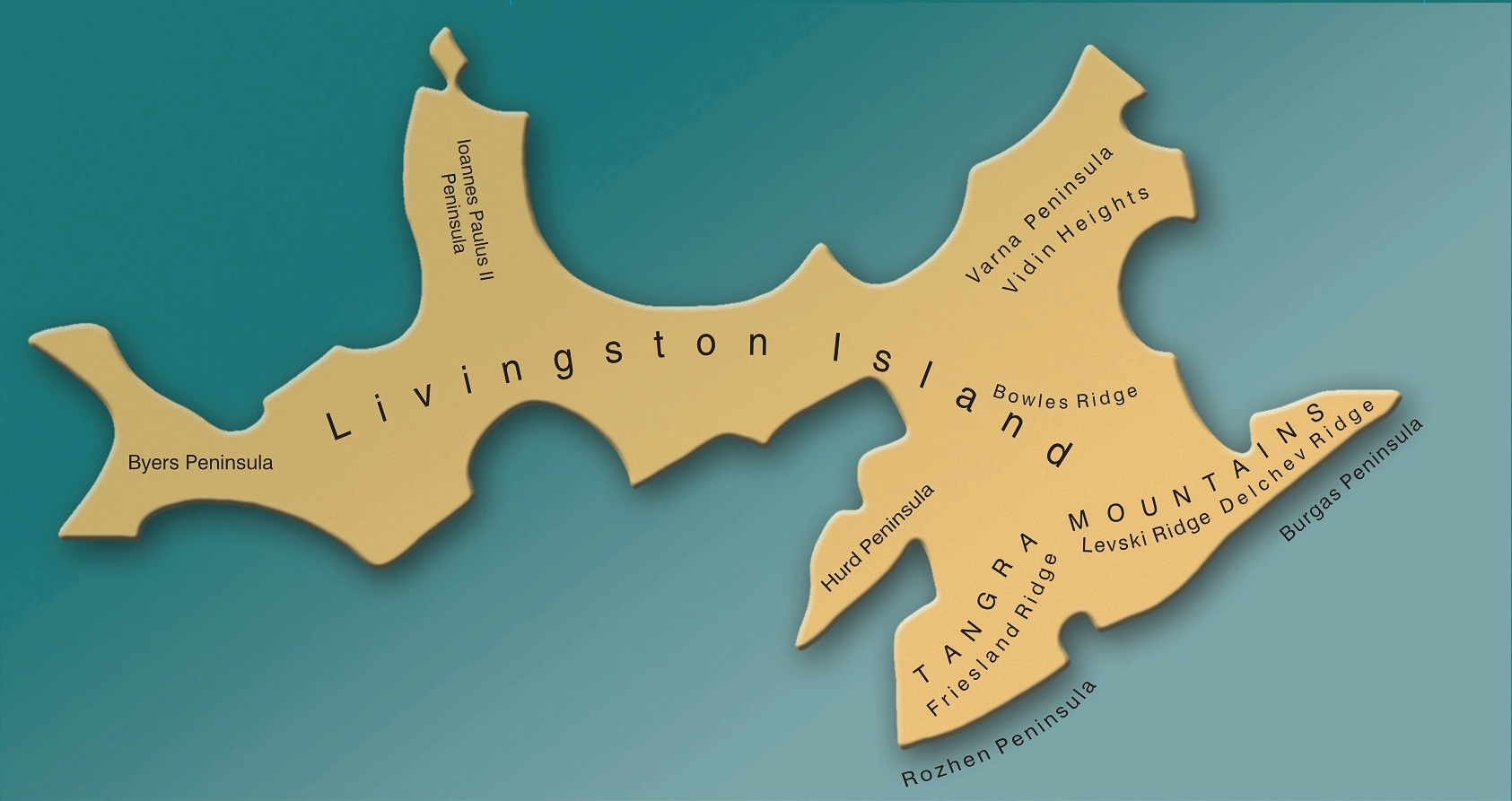
Livingston Island's peninsulas
