= Kaliman Island =

Rock in the South Shetland Islands, Antarctica

Nickname: The Great Big
- Location of Livingston Island in the South Shetland Islands

- Location on Antarctic Peninsula Location in Antarctica

Geography
- Location: Antarctica
- Coordinates: 62°37′31″S 60°39′44″W
- Archipelago: South Shetland Islands
- Total islands: 13
- Major islands: 2

Administration
- Antarctica
- Administered under the Antarctic Treaty System

Demographics
- Population: uninhabited

Kaliman Island (Bulgarian: остров Калиман, romanized: ostrov Kaliman, IPA: [ˈɔstrof kɐliˈman]) is the triangular, flat rocky island extending 250 m in south-southeast to north-northwest direction and 80 m wide in Walker Bay, Livingston Island in Antarctica. It is named after Czar Kaliman Asen of Bulgaria (1241–1246 AD).

== Location ==
Kaliman Island is located at 62°37′31″S 60°39′44″W, which is 3.9 km northwest of Hannah Point, 9.5 km northeast of Bond Point and 4.62 km south of Snow Peak, and connected to Livingston Island on the north by a 600 m long moraine tombolo. Formed as result of the retreat of Verila Glacier in the first decade of 21st century. Bulgarian mapping in 2009 and 2017.

Topographic map of Livingston Island and Smith Island

== Maps ==
- L.L. Ivanov. Antarctica: Livingston Island and Greenwich, Robert, Snow and Smith Islands. Scale 1:120000 topographic map. Troyan: Manfred Wörner Foundation, 2009.
- Antarctic Digital Database (ADD). Scale 1:250000 topographic map of Antarctica. Scientific Committee on Antarctic Research (SCAR). Since 1993, regularly upgraded and updated
- L.L. Ivanov. Antarctica: Livingston Island and Smith Island. Scale 1:100000 topographic map. Manfred Wörner Foundation, 2017.
