= Linzipar Lake =

Antarctic lake

- Location within South Shetland Islands
- Location: Livingston Island, Antarctica
- Coordinates: 62°41′12″S 60°52′06″W
- Lake type: Glacial lake
- Max. length: 295 metres (968 ft)
- Max. width: 200 metres (660 ft)
- Surface area: 4 hectares (9.9 acres)

Map of Livingston, Greenwich, Robert, Snow and Smith Islands featuring Bond Point

Linzipar Lake (Bulgarian: езеро Линзипар, romanized: ezero Linzipar, IPA: [ˈɛzɛro ˈlinzipɐr]) is a lake 295 m long in a northwest–southeast direction and 200 m wide, located on the south coast of Livingston Island in the South Shetland Islands, Antarctica. It has a surface area of 4 ha and is separated from the waters of Kavarna Cove by a strip of land 13 to 35 m wide. The area was visited during early 19th century sealers expeditions.

Linzipar is a name of Thracian origin used for a hill in Northern Bulgaria.

== Location ==
Linzipar Lake is situated at the base of Bond Point and centered at 62°40′24″S 60°48′37″W, 3.28 km northeast of Elephant Point and 4 km west by south of Hetty Rock. Bulgarian mapping of the area was conducted in 2009 and 2017.

== Maps ==
- L. Ivanov. Antarctica: Livingston Island and Greenwich, Robert, Snow and Smith Islands. Scale 1:120000 topographic map. Troyan: Manfred Wörner Foundation, 2009. ISBN 978-954-92032-6-4
- L. Ivanov. Antarctica: Livingston Island and Smith Island. Scale 1:100000 topographic map. Manfred Wörner Foundation, 2017. ISBN 978-619-90008-3-0
- Antarctic Digital Database (ADD). Scale 1:250000 topographic map of Antarctica. Scientific Committee on Antarctic Research (SCAR). Regularly upgraded and updated since 1993.

== See also ==
- Antarctic lakes
- Livingston Island
