= Verila Glacier =

Glacier in Antarctica

- Location of Livingston Island in the South Shetland Islands

- Location within South Shetland Islands Location within Antarctica
- Location: Livingston Island; South Shetland Islands
- Coordinates: 62°36′15″S 60°42′00″W
- Length: 7 nautical miles (13 km; 8.1 mi)
- Width: 2 nautical miles (3.7 km; 2.3 mi)
- Thickness: unknown
- Terminus: Walker Bay
- Status: unknown

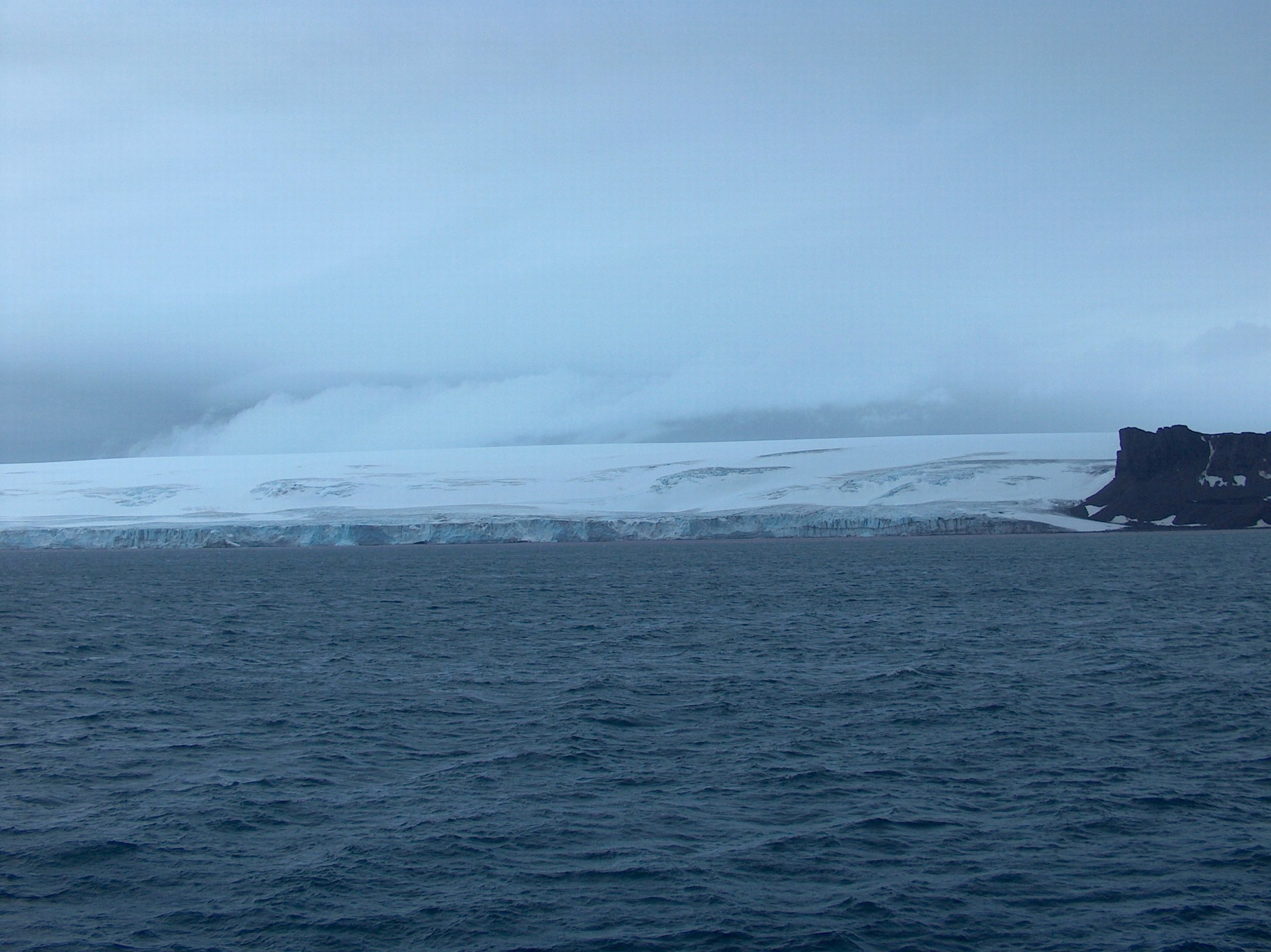
Verila Glacier from Walker Bay, with Ustra Peak on the right

Topographic map of Livingston Island and Smith Island

Verila Glacier (Bulgarian: ледник Верила, romanized: lednik Verila, IPA: [ˈlɛdniɡ vɛˈriɫɐ]) on Livingston Island in the South Shetland Islands, Antarctica is situated southeast of southern Etar Snowfield, southwest of Berkovitsa and Tundzha Glaciers, and west of Kamchiya Glacier.

It is bounded by Rotch Dome to the west, Casanovas Peak and Snow Peak to the north, and Ustra Peak to the southeast. The glacier is roughly crescent-shaped, extending 7 nautical miles (13 km; 8.1 mi) in an east-west direction and 2 nautical miles (3.7 km; 2.3 mi) in a north-south direction, and drains southwards into Walker Bay, Bransfield Strait between John Beach and Liverpool Beach at Hannah Point.

The glacier's bedrock is connected to Kaliman Island in Walker Bay by a 600 m-long (2,000 ft) moraine tombolo. The area was visited by 19th-century British and American sealers.

The feature is named after Verila Mountain in Western Bulgaria.

== Location ==
The glacier's exact midpoint is located at 62°36′15″S 60°42′00″W (Bulgarian mapping in 2005, 2009 and 2017).

== Maps ==
- Chart of South Shetland including Coronation Island, &c. from the exploration of the sloop Dove in the years 1821 and 1822 by George Powell Commander of the same. Scale ca. 1:200000. London: Laurie, 1822
- L.L. Ivanov et al. Antarctica: Livingston Island and Greenwich Island, South Shetland Islands. Scale 1:100000 topographic map. Sofia: Antarctic Place-names Commission of Bulgaria, 2005.
- L.L. Ivanov. Antarctica: Livingston Island and Greenwich, Robert, Snow and Smith Islands. Scale 1:120000 topographic map. Troyan: Manfred Wörner Foundation, 2010. ISBN 978-954-92032-9-5 (First edition 2009. ISBN 978-954-92032-6-4)
- Antarctic Digital Database (ADD). Scale 1:250000 topographic map of Antarctica. Scientific Committee on Antarctic Research (SCAR). Since 1993, regularly upgraded and updated.
- L.L. Ivanov. Antarctica: Livingston Island and Smith Island. Scale 1:100000 topographic map. Manfred Wörner Foundation, 2017. ISBN 978-619-90008-3-0

== In fiction ==
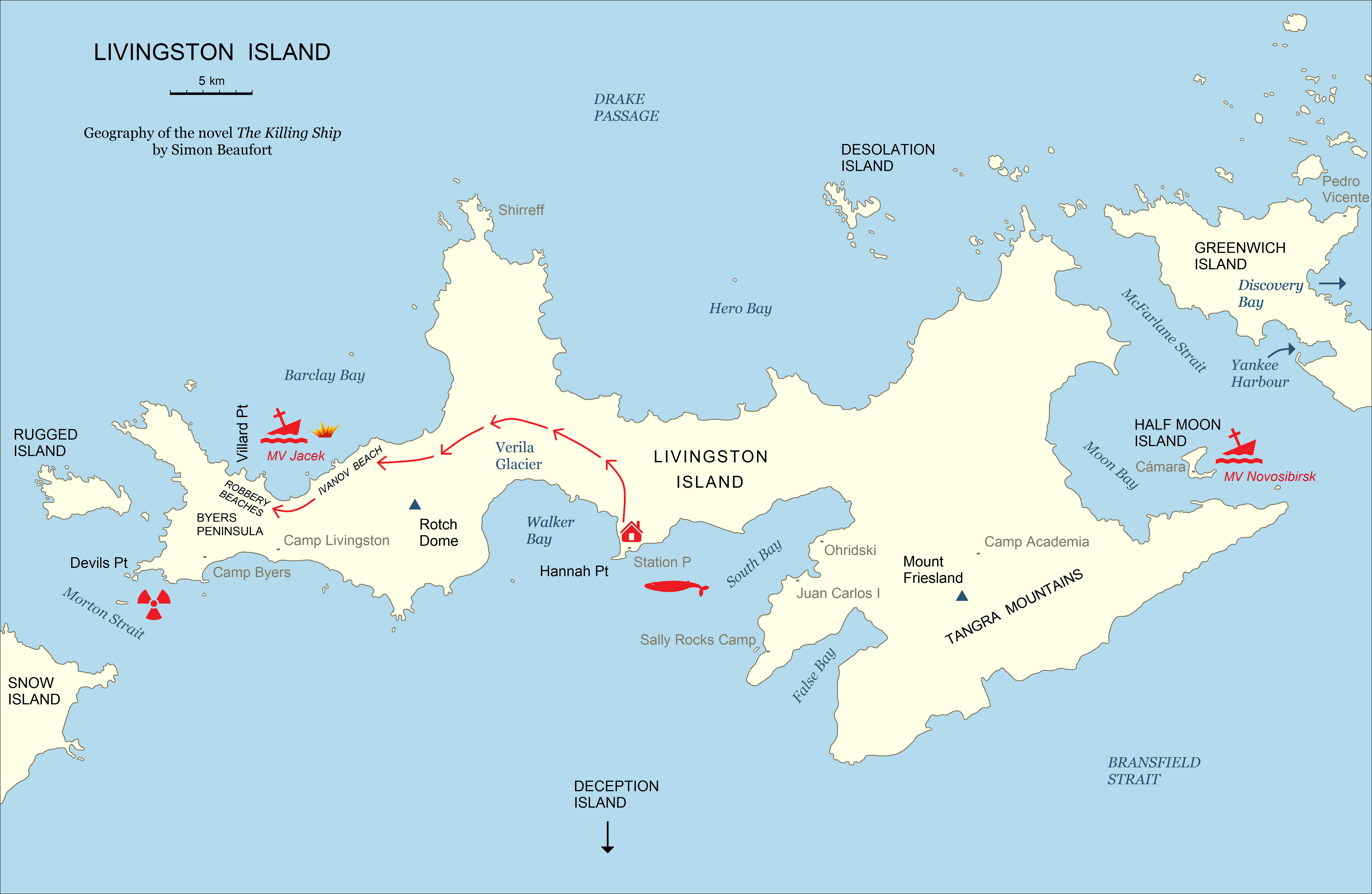
Geography of the thriller novel The Killing Ship by Simon Beaufort.

Verila Glacier is part of the mise-en-scène in the 2016 Antarctica thriller novel The Killing Ship by Simon Beaufort, with action spreading westwards from Hannah Point, skirting the glacier and eventually reaching Byers Peninsula; the glacier is shown on a sketch map of Livingston Island illustrating the book.

== See also ==
- List of glaciers in the Antarctic
- Glaciology
