= Mihaylovski Cove =

Cove of Livingston Island, South Shetland Islands

Location of Livingston Island in the South Shetland Islands

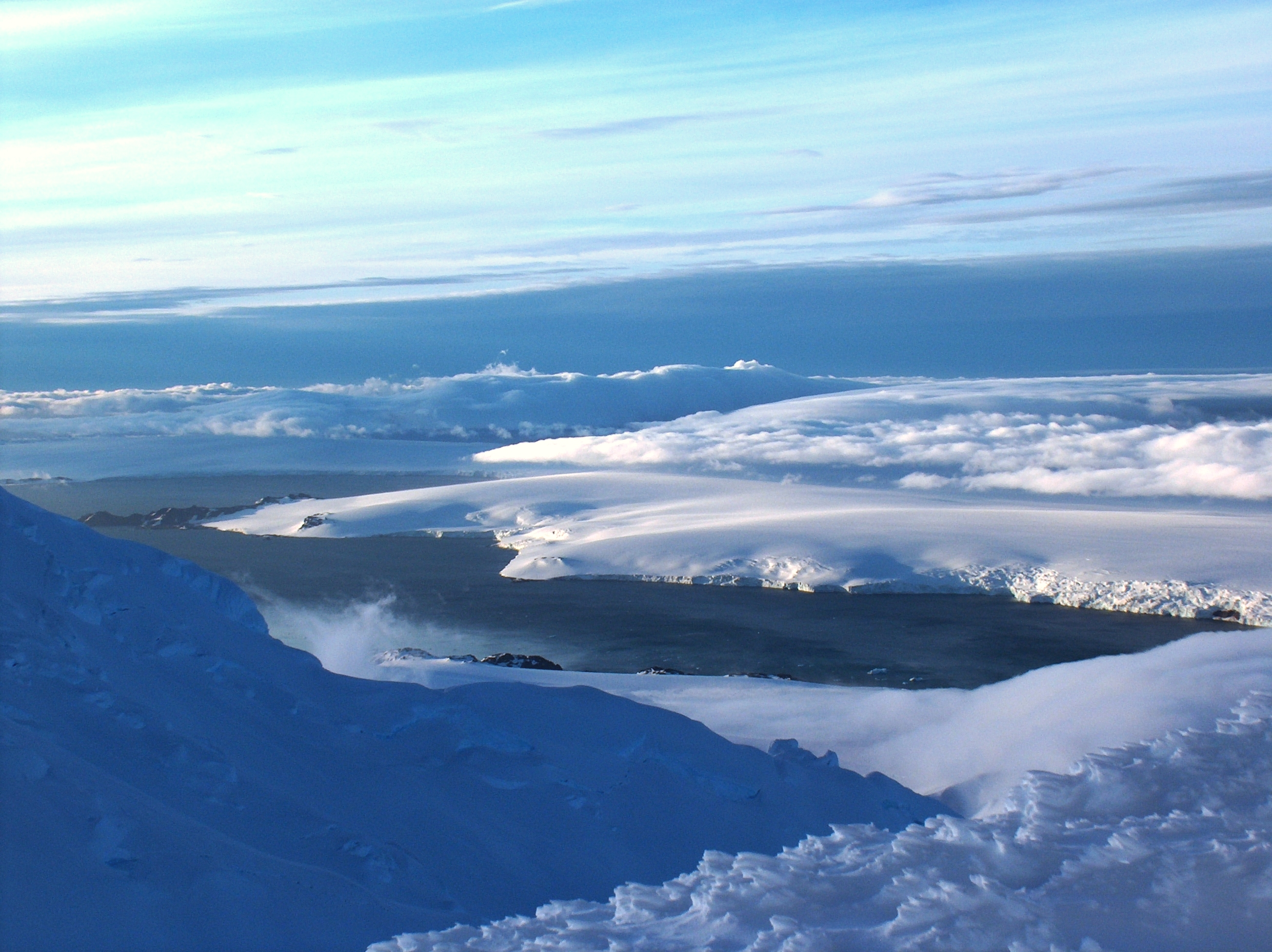
South Bay Bay from Lyaskovets Peak, with Mihaylovski Cove and Hannah Point on the left

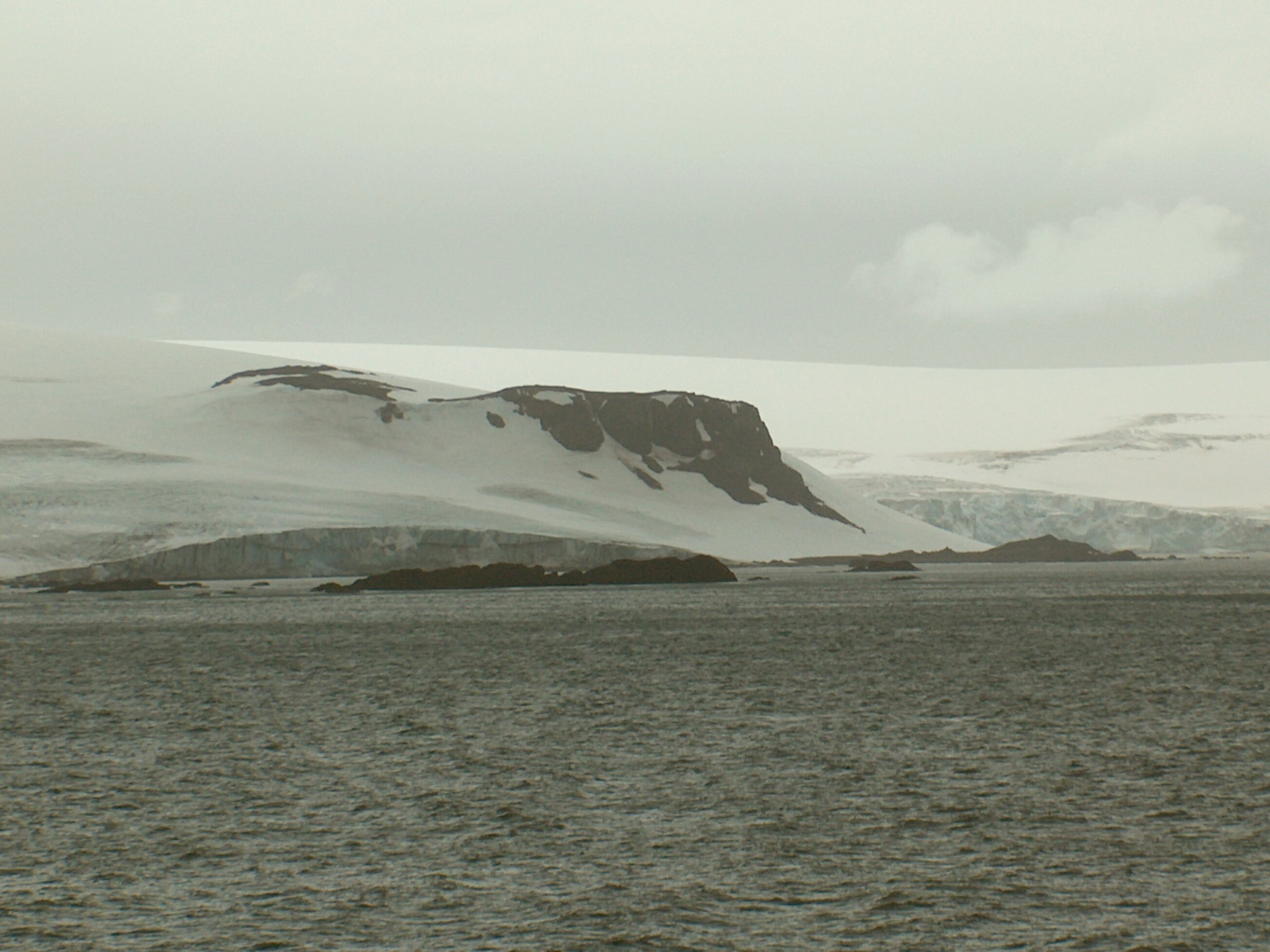
Krakra Bluff with Lukovo Point, Nessie Rock and Mihaylovski Cove on the right

Topographic map of Livingston Island and Smith Island

Mihaylovski Cove (Bulgarian: Михайловски залив, romanized: Mihaylovski zaliv, IPA: [mihajˈlɔfski ˈzalif]) is the 5 km wide cove indenting for 1.3 km the northwest coast of South Bay in Livingston Island, Antarctica that is entered west of Ereby Point and east of Lukovo Point, and has its head fed by Kamchiya Glacier. The area was known to early 19th century sealers who operated from nearby Johnsons Dock. The feature is named after the brothers Petar Mihaylovski, physician at St. Kliment Ohridski base during the 2007/08 and subsequent seasons, and Hristo Mihaylovski, engineer in the national Antarctic campaign during 2015/16 and subsequent seasons.

== Location ==
Mihaylovski Cove is centred at 62°38′10″S 60°31′10″W. British mapping in 1968, Chilean in 1971, Argentine in 1980, and Bulgarian in 2005, 2009 and 2017.

== Related features ==
=== Lukovo Point ===
Lukovo Point is the mostly ice-free point on the northwest coast of South Bay in Livingston Island, Antarctica projecting 200 m southwards. It is surmounted by Krakra Bluff on the north. Lukovo Point is centred at 62°38′38.7″S 60°33′24″W, which is 1.8 km northeast of Aldan Rock, 3.15 km east-northeast of Hannah Point, 5 km west-southwest of Ereby Point and 10.5 km northwest of Miers Bluff. The feature is named after the settlements Lukovo in Western Bulgaria, and Gorno (Upper) and Dolno (Lower) Lukovo in Southern Bulgaria. Interactive image.

=== Memorable Beach ===
Memorable Beach is the exposed, rocky, south facing beach centred at 62°38′22″S 60°32′51.6″W and situated east of Lukovo Point in South Bay, Livingston Island in Antarctica. The feature was named Playa Memorable by Spain circa 1991. Interactive image.

=== Nessie Rock ===
Nessie Rock is the rock at the entrance to Mihaylovski Cove in the northwest of South Bay, Livingston Island in Antarctica 111 m long in southeast–northwest direction and 50 m wide, with a surface area of 0.4 ha. It is located at 62°38′36.7″S 60°32′58.5″W, which is 3.8 km east-northeast from Hannah Point, 340 m east of Lukovo Point and 4.67 km west-southwest of Ereby Point. Bulgarian mapping in 2009 and 2017. The feature is so named because of its shape supposedly resembling the mythical Loch Ness monster. Interactive image.

== Maps ==
- L.L. Ivanov et al. Antarctica: Livingston Island and Greenwich Island, South Shetland Islands. Scale 1:100000 topographic map. Sofia: Antarctic Place-names Commission of Bulgaria, 2005
- L.L. Ivanov. Antarctica: Livingston Island and Greenwich, Robert, Snow and Smith Islands. Scale 1:120000 topographic map. Troyan: Manfred Wörner Foundation, 2009. ISBN 978-954-92032-6-4
- L.L. Ivanov. Antarctica: Livingston Island and Smith Island. Scale 1:100000 topographic map. Manfred Wörner Foundation, 2017. ISBN 978-619-90008-3-0
- Antarctic Digital Database (ADD). Scale 1:250000 topographic map of Antarctica. Scientific Committee on Antarctic Research (SCAR). Since 1993, regularly upgraded and updated
