= Station P =

- Antarctic camp
- Location on Livingston Island

- Location in Antarctica
- Coordinates: 62°38′57″S 60°35′25″W
- Region: South Shetland Islands
- Location: Hannah Point
- Established: 29 December 1957
- Closed: 15 March 1958

Government
  - Type: Administration
  - Body: BAS, United Kingdom
- Active times: One summer
- Status: Abandoned
- Website: bas.ac.uk

Location of Livingston Island in the South Shetland Islands

Station P was a British base camp at the head of Mateev Cove on the east side of Hannah Point, Livingston Island in the South Shetland Islands, Antarctica that supported survey, geology and biology field work from 29 December 1957 until 15 March 1958. The camp was occupied by a six-member team led by Hugh Simpson. The surveyed areas included parts of Byers Peninsula, Elephant Point, Ioannes Paulus II Peninsula and Hurd Peninsula.

A hut intended for erection on the site failed to reach its destination, as the ship RRS Shackleton transporting it was damaged by the ice and parts of the hut were used in the ship's repair. As a result, the plans for a more permanent British presence on the island failed to materialize.

The area was visited by early 19th century sealers frequenting nearby Johnsons Dock.

== Location ==
The encampment was located 1.32 km east-northeast of Hannah Point, 1.07 km south-southeast of Ustra Peak, 1.97 km southwest of Krakra Bluff, 6.88 km west by south of Ereby Point and 9.34 km northwest of Salisbury Bluff (British mapping in 1858, and Bulgarian mapping of the area in 2005, 2009 and 2017).

== See also ==
- Hannah Point
- Livingston Island
- List of Antarctic research stations
- List of Antarctic field camps
- Crime in Antarctica

== Maps ==
- G.J. Hobbs. Map showing the physiography, geological station numbers and the survey routes on Livingston Island. In: The geology of Livingston Island . Scientific Report No. 47. British Antarctic Survey, 1963. Figure 1
- L.L. Ivanov et al. Antarctica: Livingston Island and Greenwich Island, South Shetland Islands. Scale 1:100000 topographic map. Sofia: Antarctic Place-names Commission of Bulgaria, 2005
- L.L. Ivanov. Antarctica: Livingston Island and Greenwich, Robert, Snow and Smith Islands. Scale 1:120000 topographic map. Troyan: Manfred Wörner Foundation, 2009. ISBN 978-954-92032-6-4
- Antarctic Digital Database (ADD). Scale 1:250000 topographic map of Antarctica. Scientific Committee on Antarctic Research (SCAR). Since 1993, regularly upgraded and updated
- L.L. Ivanov. Antarctica: Livingston Island and Smith Island. Scale 1:100000 topographic map. Manfred Wörner Foundation, 2017. ISBN 978-619-90008-3-0

== In fiction ==
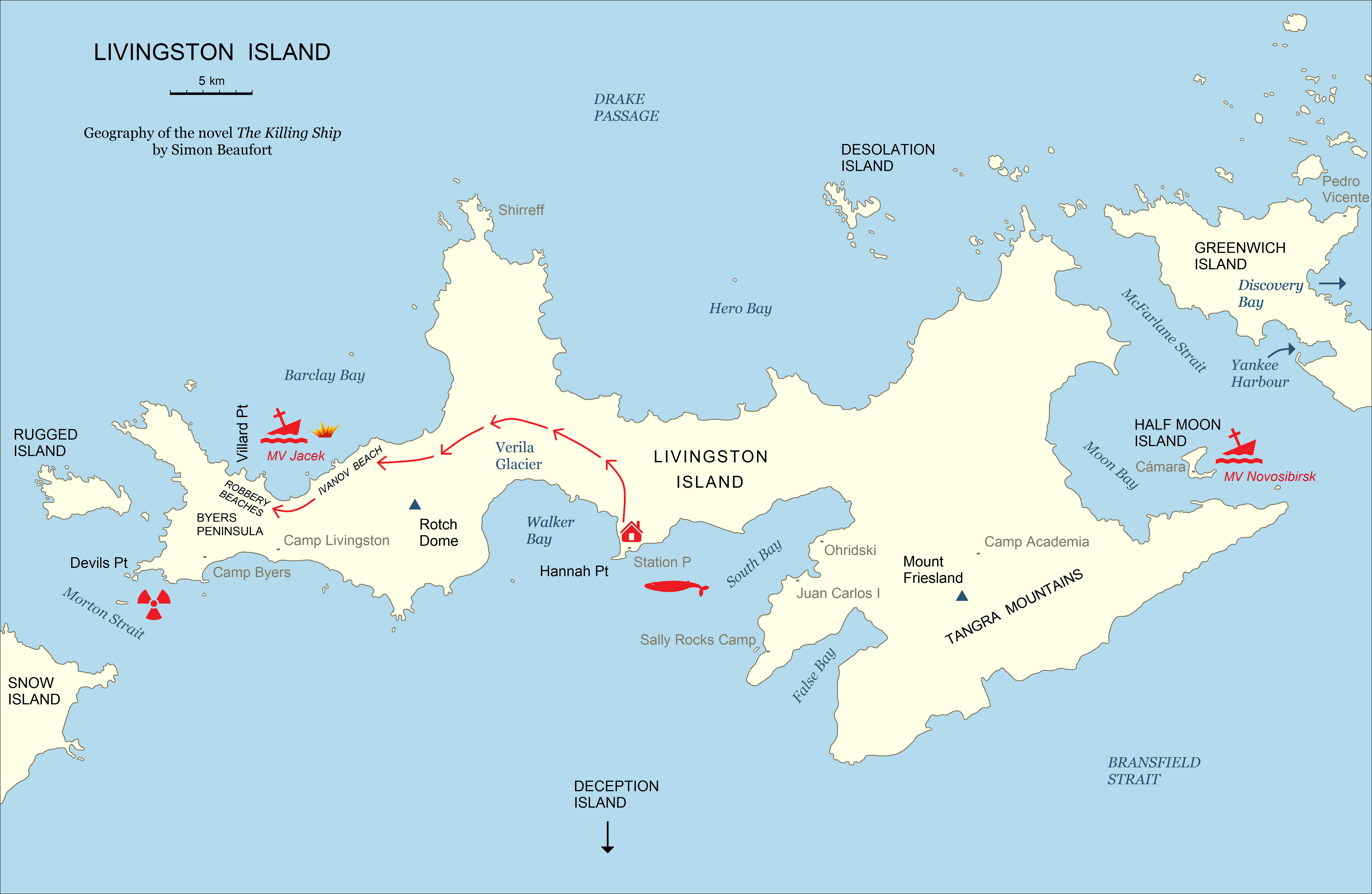
Geography of the thriller novel The Killing Ship by Simon Beaufort

The idea of having a seasonal base camp supporting field work in Hannah Point area is exploited in the 2016 Antarctica thriller novel The Killing Ship by Simon Beaufort.
