= John Beach (Livingston Island) =

Antarctic beach

Location of Livingston Island in the South Shetland Islands.

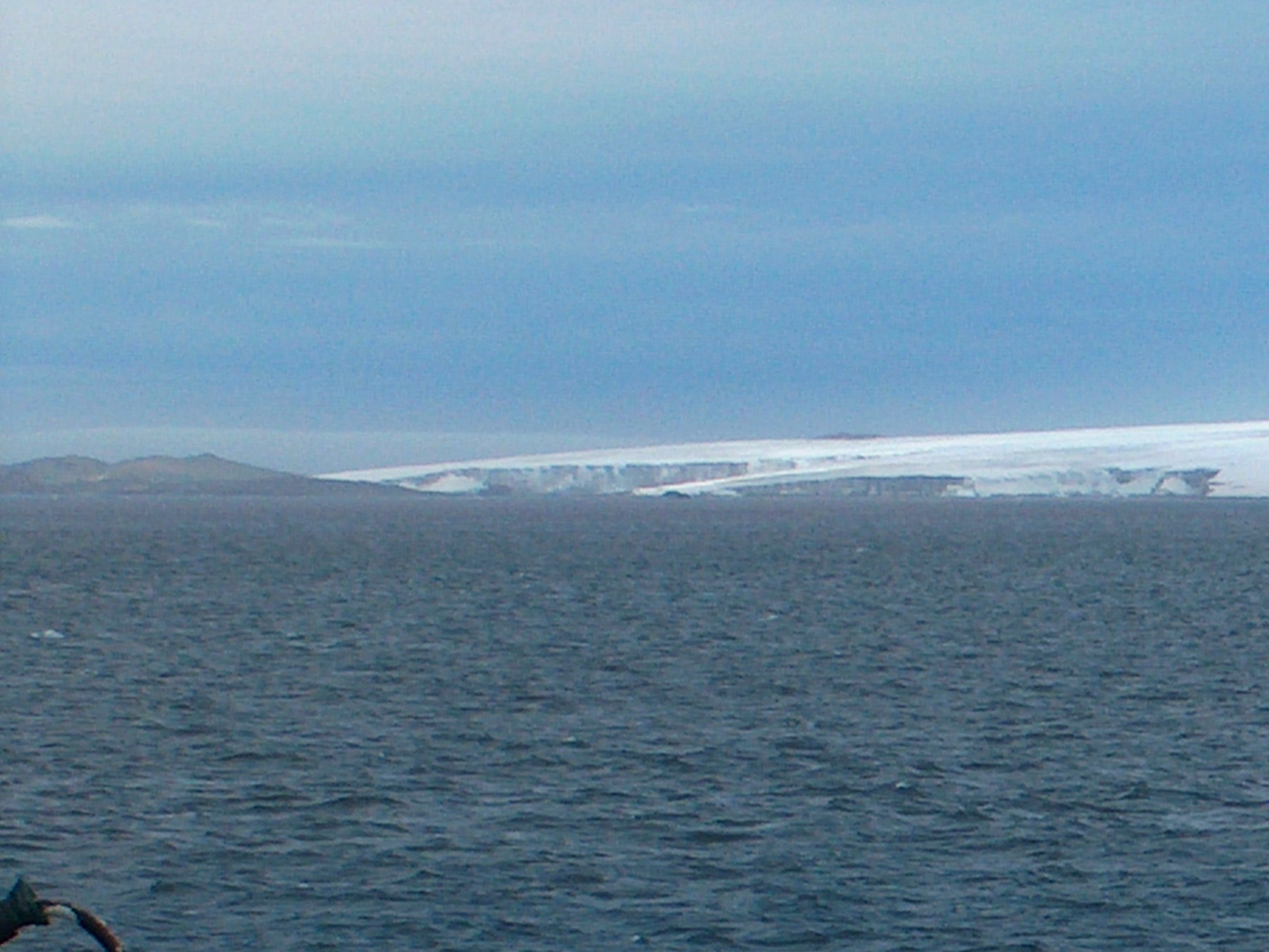
John Beach (on the right) from near Hannah Point, with Bond Point in the centre and Elephant Point on the left.

Topographic map of Livingston Island, Greenwich, Robert, Snow and Smith Islands.

John Beach (62°39′23″S 60°45′44″W) is a beach on the west side of the entrance to Walker Bay on the south coast of Livingston Island, in the South Shetland Islands. The ice-free area is around 109 hectares (270 acres).

The beach was roughly charted and named "Black Point" by Robert Fildes in 1820–22. As there was already a Black Point on Livingston Island, this name was rejected and a new one substituted by the UK Antarctic Place-Names Committee in 1958. John Beach is named after the brig John (Captain John Walker) of London, which was sealing in the South Shetland Islands in 1820–21 and 1821–22.

== Map ==
- L.L. Ivanov et al. Antarctica: Livingston Island and Greenwich Island, South Shetland Islands. Scale 1:100000 topographic map. Sofia: Antarctic Place-names Commission of Bulgaria, 2005.
