= Yasen Point =

Sharp rocky point in the South Shetland Islands, Antarctica

Location of Livingston Island in the South Shetland Islands.

Topographic map of Livingston Island and Smith Island

Yasen Point (Bulgarian: нос Ясен, ‘Nos Yasen’ \'nos 'ya-sen\) is the sharp, rocky point on the south coast of Livingston Island in the South Shetland Islands, Antarctica, forming the west side of the entrance to Mateev Cove. Situated on the east side of the small ice-free promontory ending in Hannah Point to the west.

The point is named after the settlements of Yasen in Northwestern and Northern Bulgaria.

== Location ==
Yasen Point is located at 62°39′11″S 60°35′48″W, which is 870 m east-northeast of the Hannah Point and 7.3 km west-southwest of Ereby Point. British mapping in 1968, Chilean in 1971, Argentine in 1980, and Bulgarian in 2005 and 2009.

== Maps ==
- L.L. Ivanov et al. Antarctica: Livingston Island and Greenwich Island, South Shetland Islands. Scale 1:100000 topographic map. Sofia: Antarctic Place-names Commission of Bulgaria, 2005.
- L.L. Ivanov. Antarctica: Livingston Island and Greenwich, Robert, Snow and Smith Islands. Scale 1:120000 topographic map. Troyan: Manfred Wörner Foundation, 2010. ISBN 978-954-92032-9-5 (First edition 2009. ISBN 978-954-92032-6-4)
- Antarctic Digital Database (ADD). Scale 1:250000 topographic map of Antarctica. Scientific Committee on Antarctic Research (SCAR). Since 1993, regularly updated.
- L.L. Ivanov. Antarctica: Livingston Island and Smith Island. Scale 1:100000 topographic map. Manfred Wörner Foundation, 2017. ISBN 978-619-90008-3-0
