= Hetty Rock =

Rock in the South Shetland Islands, Antarctica

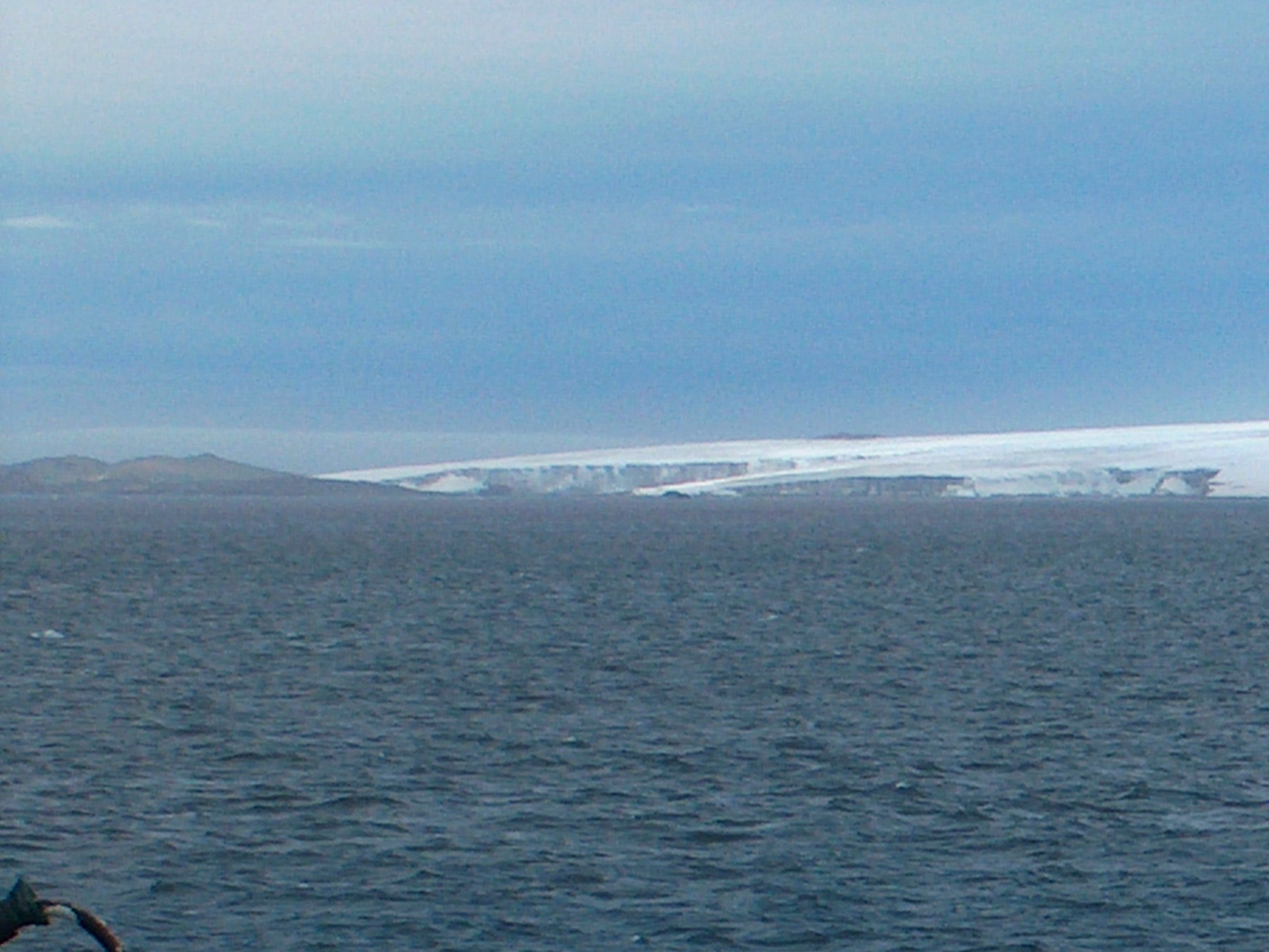
- Hetty Rock (in the centre) from near Hannah Point, with Bond Point behind it and Elephant Point on the left

- Location of Livingston Island in the South Shetland Islands

- Location on Antarctic Peninsula Location in Antarctica

Geography
- Location: Antarctica
- Coordinates: 62°40′05.6″S 60°43′54″W
- Archipelago: South Shetland Islands

Administration
- Antarctica
- Administered under the Antarctic Treaty System

Demographics
- Population: uninhabited

Hetty Rock is the largest of several rocks in Walker Bay off John Beach in western Livingston Island in the South Shetland Islands, Antarctica. The area was visited by early 19th century sealers.

The feature is named after the British sealing ship Hetty under Captain Ralph Bond that operated in the South Shetlands in 1820–21.

== Location ==
The rock is located at 62°40′05.6″S 60°43′54″W which is 7.02 km (4.36 mi) east-northeast of Elephant Point, 1.92 km (1.19 mi) southeast of John Beach and 6.24 km (3.88 mi) west-southwest of Hannah Point (British mapping in 1935 and 1968, Chilean in 1971, Argentine in 1980, and Bulgarian in 2005 and 2009).

Topographic map of Livingston Island, Greenwich, Robert, Snow and Smith Islands.

== See also ==
- Composite Antarctic Gazetteer
- List of Antarctic islands south of 60° S
- SCAR
- Territorial claims in Antarctica

== Maps ==
- L.L. Ivanov et al. Antarctica: Livingston Island and Greenwich Island, South Shetland Islands. Scale 1:100000 topographic map. Sofia: Antarctic Place-names Commission of Bulgaria, 2005.
- L.L. Ivanov. Antarctica: Livingston Island and Greenwich, Robert, Snow and Smith Islands. Scale 1:120000 topographic map. Troyan: Manfred Wörner Foundation, 2009. ISBN 978-954-92032-6-4
