= Liverpool Beach =

Beach in Antarctica

Location of Livingston Island in the South Shetland Islands

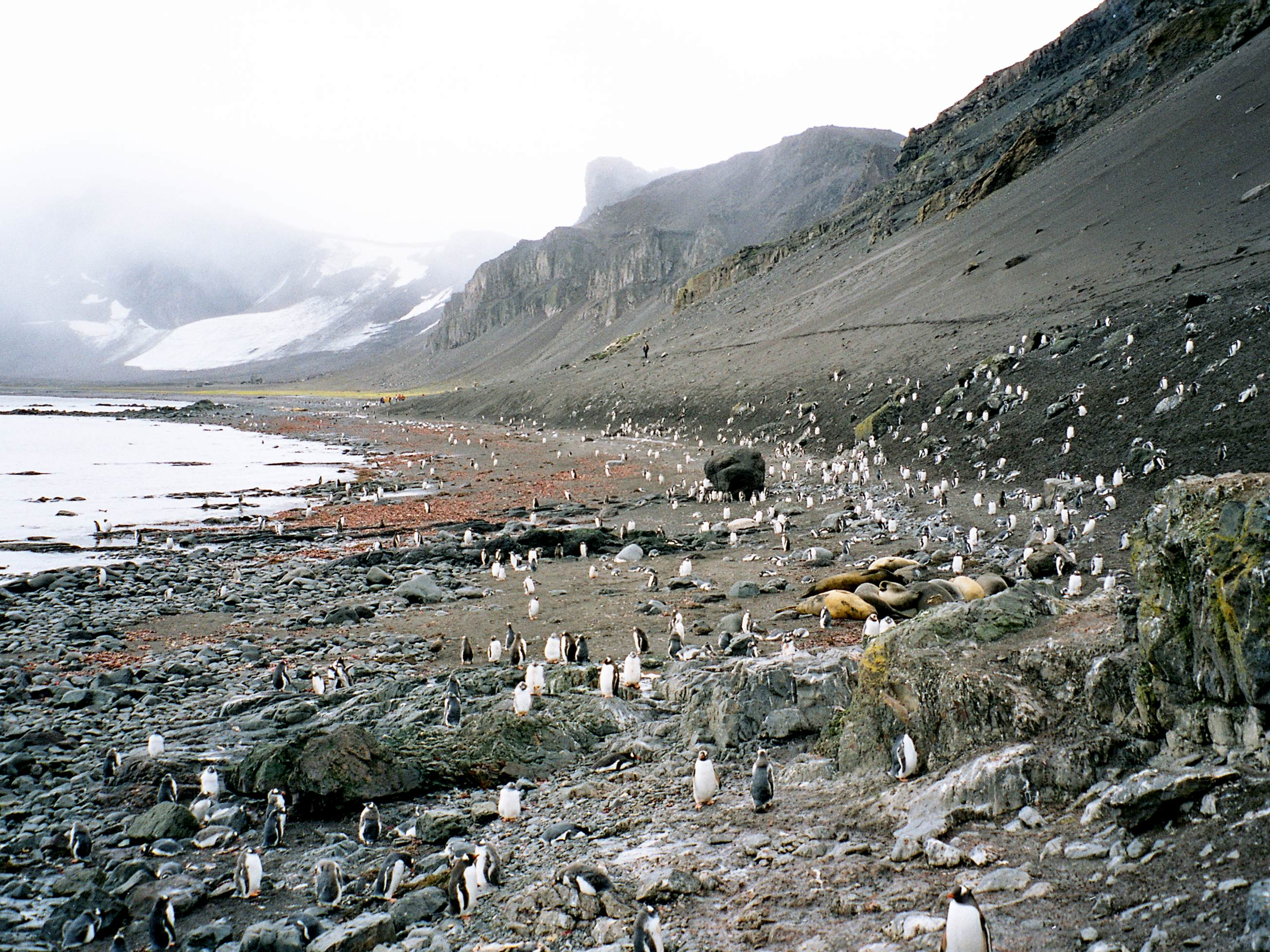
Liverpool Beach

Topographic map of Livingston Island

Liverpool Beach (Bulgarian: Ливърпулски бряг, romanized: Livarpulski bryag, IPA: [ˈlivɐrpoɫski ˈbrʲak]) is the crescent-shaped beach extending 1.8km (1.1 miles) on the east side of Walker Bay on the south coast of Livingston Island in the South Shetland Islands, Antarctica. It is situated on the west side of the small ice-free promontory ending in Hannah Point, and bounded by Hannah Point to the west, Ustra Peak to the northeast and the terminus of Verila Glacier to the north. The picturesque beach is one of the most popular tourist sites in Antarctica, frequented by cruise ships. It is also accessible by Zodiac boats from the Bulgarian base and the Spanish base on the island situated 12km (7.5 miles) to the east and 11km (6.8 miles) to the east-southeast respectively.

The beach is named after the British city of Liverpool, the home port of many 19th century sealing ships operating in the South Shetlands including the sealer Hannah after which the adjacent point is named.

== Location ==
Liverpool Beach is centred at 62°38′55″S 60°36′00″W. British mapping in 1821, 1962 and 1968, Argentine in 1959 and 1980, Chilean in 1971, Spanish in 1991, and Bulgarian in 2005, 2009 and 2017.

== Maps ==
- L.L. Ivanov. Antarctica: Livingston Island and Greenwich, Robert, Snow and Smith Islands. Scale 1:120000 topographic map. Troyan: Manfred Wörner Foundation, 2010. ISBN 978-954-92032-9-5 (First edition 2009. ISBN 978-954-92032-6-4)
- Antarctic Digital Database (ADD). Scale 1:250000 topographic map of Antarctica. Scientific Committee on Antarctic Research (SCAR). Since 1993, regularly upgraded and updated.
- L.L. Ivanov. Antarctica: Livingston Island and Smith Island. Scale 1:100000 topographic map. Manfred Wörner Foundation, 2017. ISBN 978-619-90008-3-0
