= Kavarna Cove =

Cove in the South Shetland Islands, Antarctica

Location of Livingston Island in the South Shetland Islands.

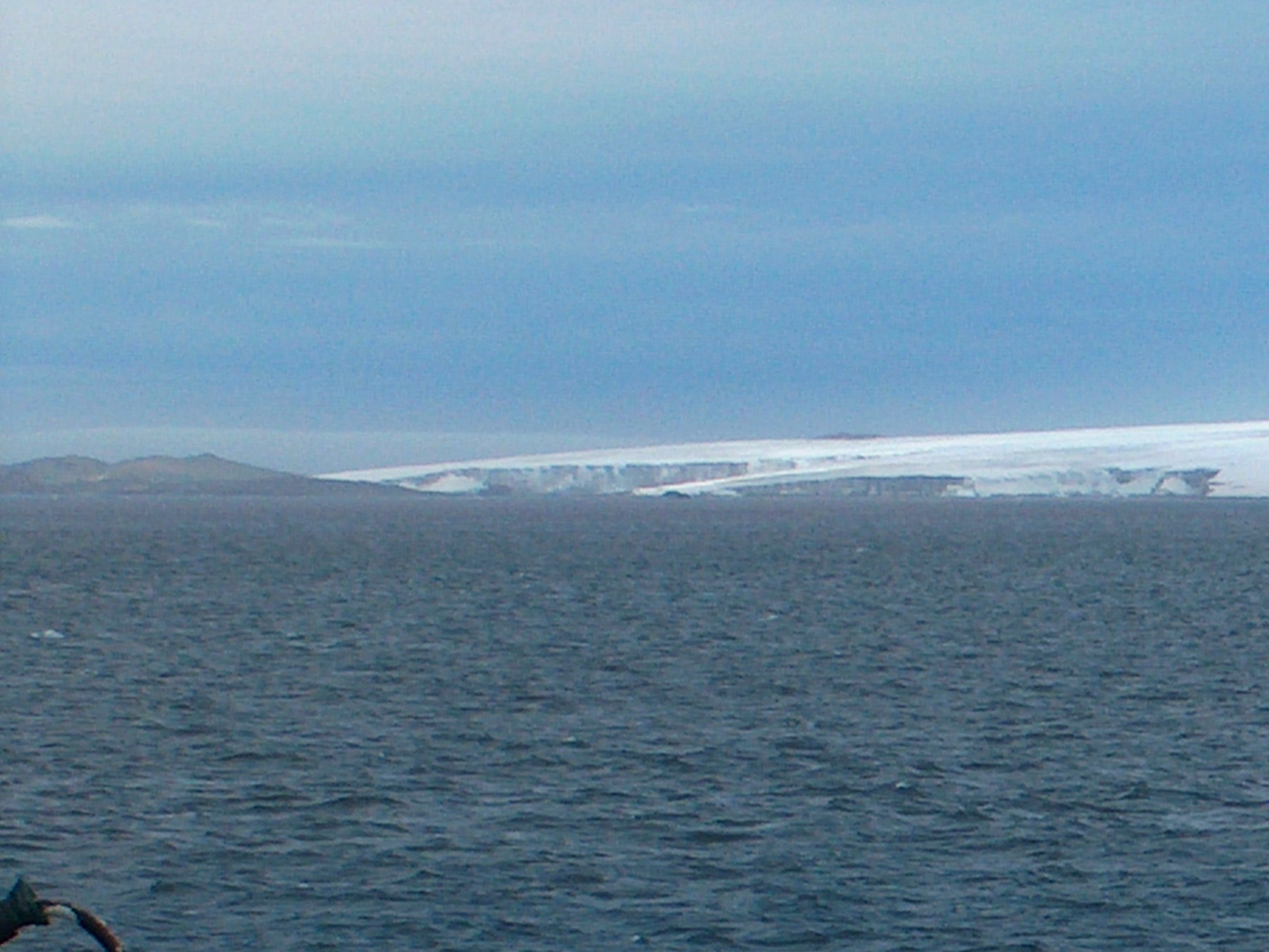
Kavarna Cove from near Hannah Point.

Topographic map of Livingston Island.

Kavarna Cove (Bulgarian: залив Каварна, romanized: zaliv Kavarna, IPA: [ˈzalif kɐˈvarnɐ]) is a 2 km wide cove indenting for 1.2 km the south coast of Livingston Island (in the South Shetland Islands, Antarctica) that is entered between Elephant Point and Bond Point. It was named after the town of Kavarna in northeastern Bulgaria.

== Location ==
The cove is located at 62°40′38″S 60°49′50″W (British mapping in 1968, Spanish in 1991, and Bulgarian in 2005 and 2009).

== See also ==
- List of Bulgarian toponyms in Antarctica
