= Lukovo, Bulgaria =

Lukovo Луково
- Village
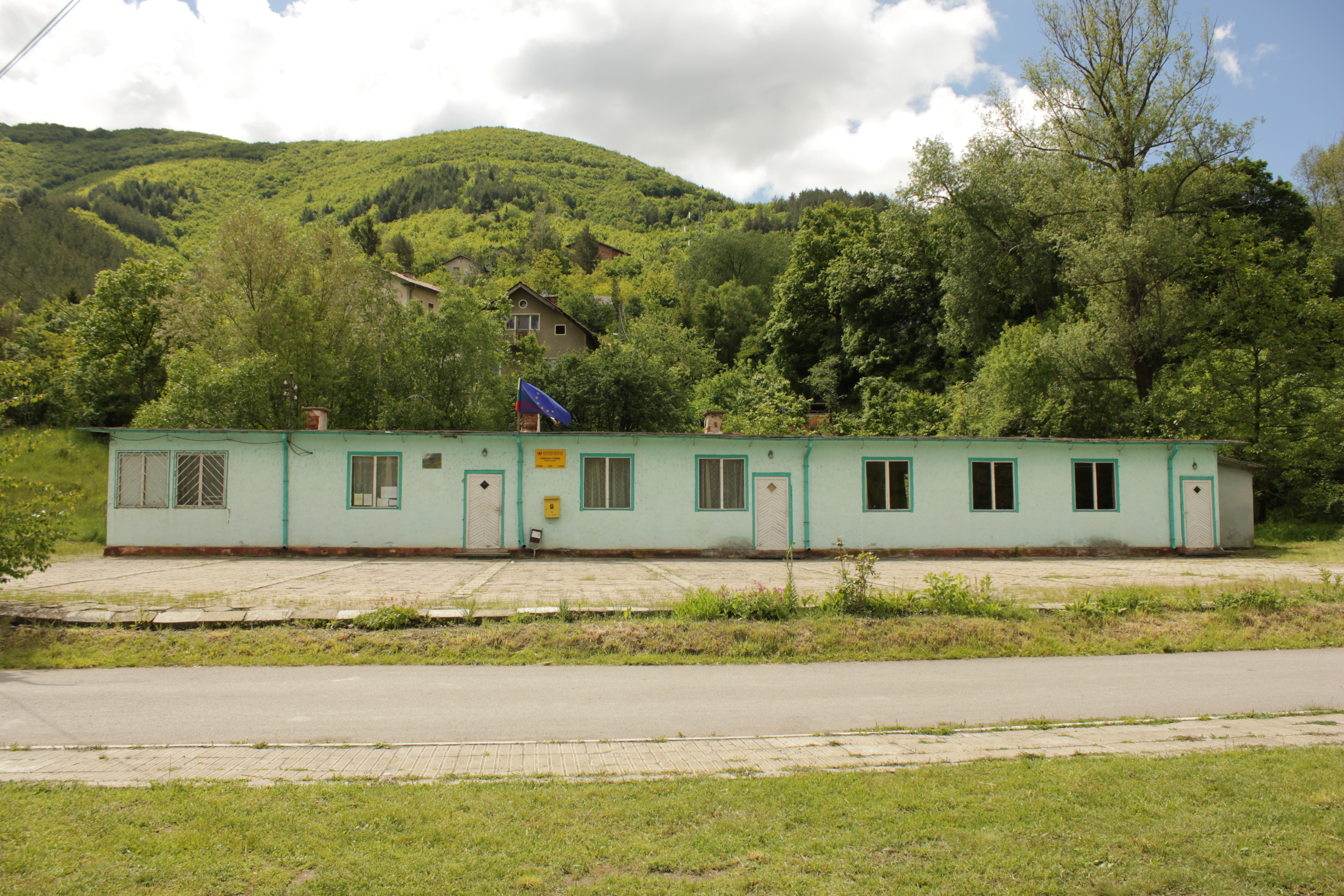

- Location in Bulgaria
- Coordinates: 42.879239°N 23.384570°E
- Country: Bulgaria
- Province: Sofia Province
- Municipality: Svoge

Population (2016)
  - Total: 279
- Time zone: UTC+2 (EET)
  - Summer (DST): UTC+3 (EEST)

Lukovo is a village in Svoge Municipality, Sofia Province, in western Bulgaria.

Lukovo Point in Antarctica is named after the village.
