= Krakra of Pernik =

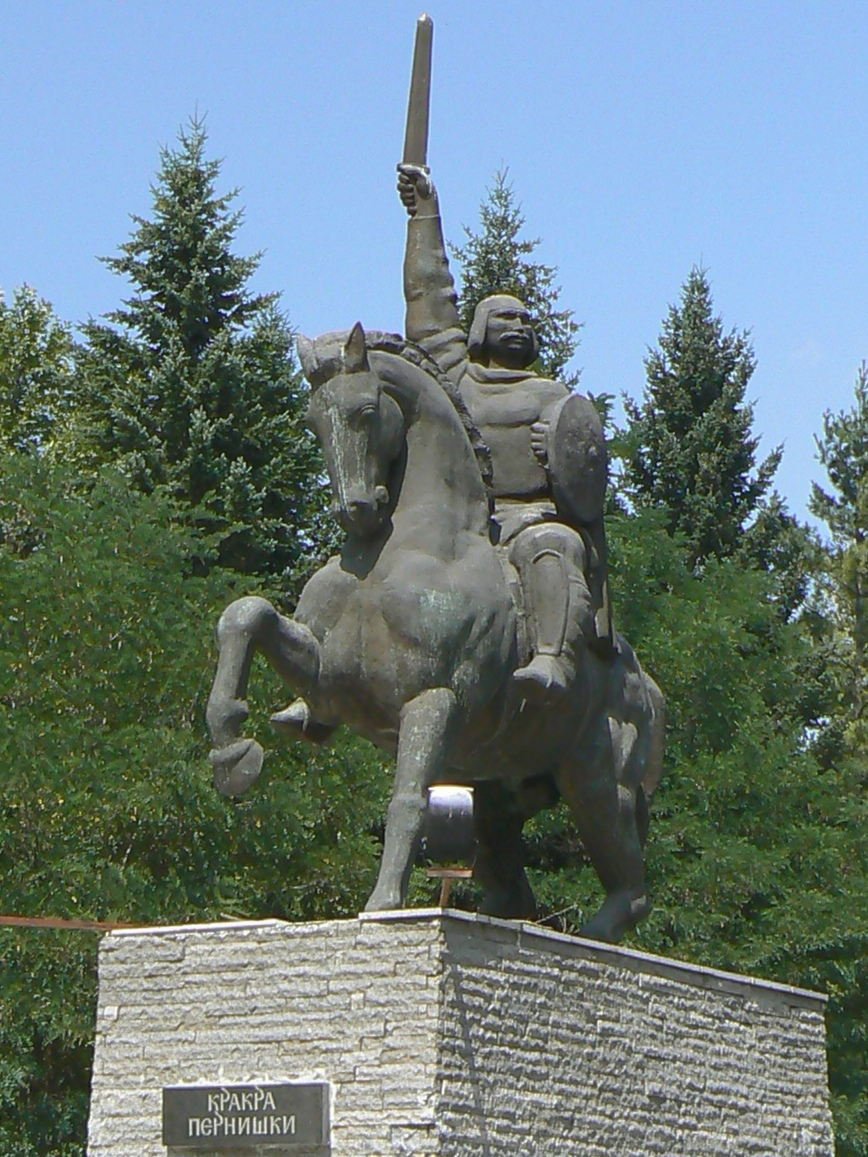
Statue of Krakra in Pernik

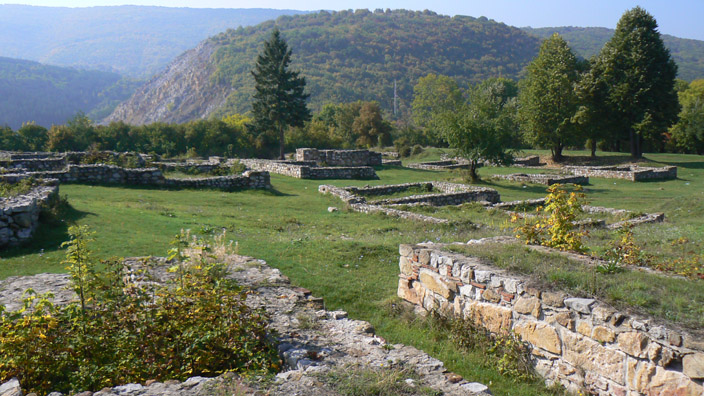
Ruins of Krakra's fortress near Pernik

Krakra of Pernik (Bulgarian: Кракра Пернишки, Krakra Pernishki), also known as Krakra Voevoda or simply Krakra, was an 11th-century Bulgarian feudal lord in the First Bulgarian Empire whose domain encompassed 36 fortresses in what is today southwestern Bulgaria, with his capital at Pernik. He is known for heroically resisting Byzantine sieges on multiple occasions as the Byzantines overran the Bulgarian Empire.

Krakra was a "man remarkable in military affairs" and a high-ranking bolyarin, possibly governor of the Sredets comitatus, under the Tsars Samuil, Gavril Radomir and Ivan Vladislav. His name appears in the historical annals in connection to a Byzantine military campaign in the Bulgarian lands in 1003 when Samuil's army was crushed at the Vardar and the Byzantines captured Skopje. As Basil II's forces headed to seize Sredets, however, in 1004 they came up against Krakra's well-defended fortress of Pernik, and the emperor was forced to return to Constantinople after sustaining heavy losses.

In 1016, another campaign by Basil II was stopped by Krakra at Pernik after an unsuccessful 88-day Byzantine siege. As the Byzantine-Bulgarian conflict continued, Krakra and Ivan Vladislav looked for Pecheneg support for a large-scale Bulgarian campaign against the Byzantines and initially persuaded the Pechenegs to collaborate in the winter of 1016–1017. However, the Byzantine governor of Dorystolon learned about the plan and notified Basil II. Upon hearing this, the Pechenegs declined to take part, effectively ruining the Bulgarian plans.

Following the death of Ivan Vladislav at Dyrrhachium in early 1018, Basil II entered the Bulgarian territory in March 1018 without meeting any resistance. At Adrianople, Krakra and 35 other bolyari's envoys met with him and after negotiating generous concessions from Basil II, including creating Theme Bulgaria and a separate Bulgarian archbishop chose to join the Eastern Roman Empire. Basil II met with Krakra personally in Serres and awarded him the title of patrikios.

== Honour ==
Krakra Bluff on Livingston Island in the South Shetland Islands, Antarctica is named after Krakra.
