= Mateev Cove =

Cove in the South Shetland Islands, Antarctica

Location of Livingston Island in the South Shetland Islands.

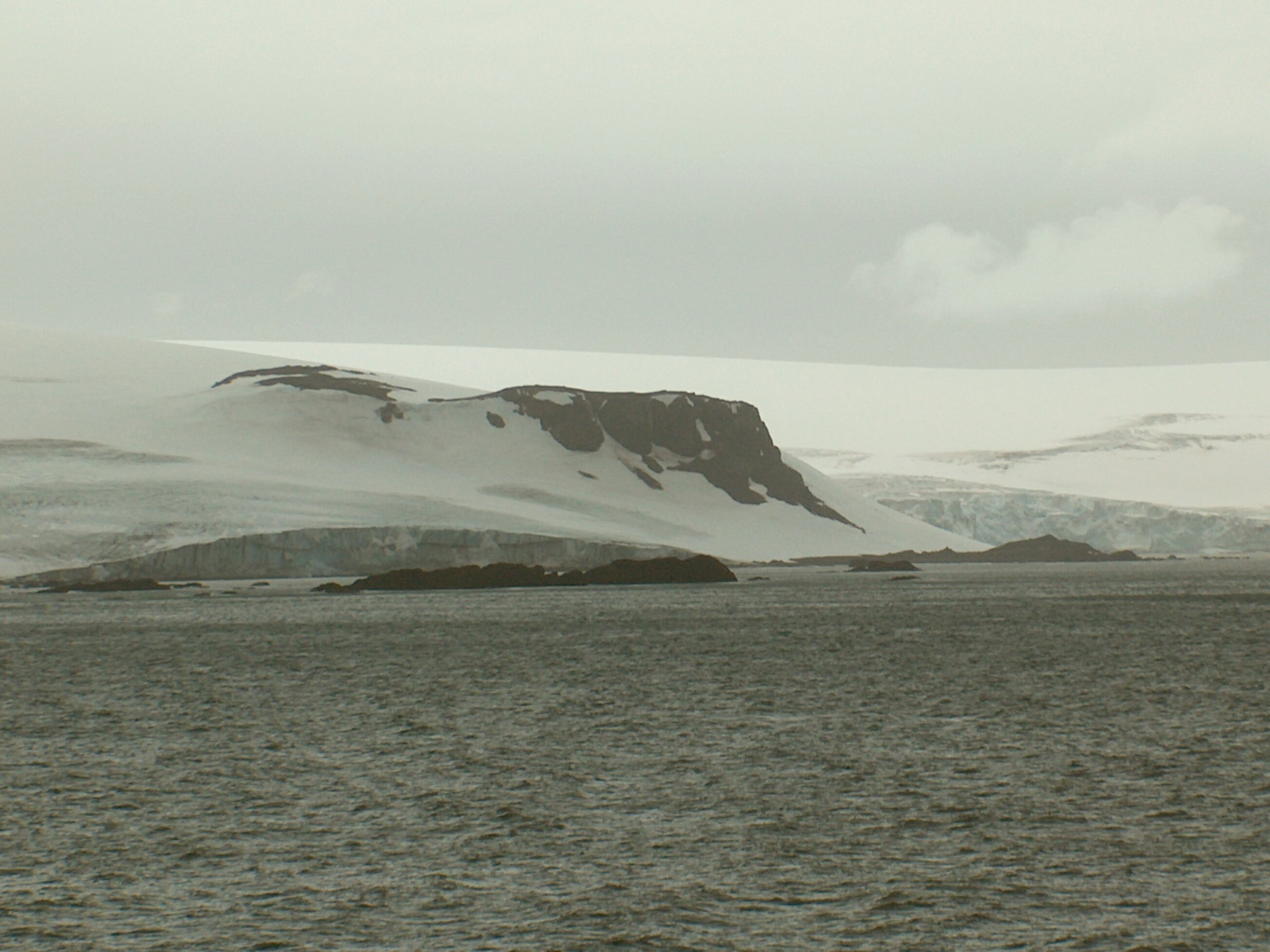
Aldan Rock from South Bay, with Krakra Bluff in the background.

Topographic map of Livingston Island and Smith Island.

Mateev Cove (Bulgarian: Матеев залив, romanized: Mateev zaliv, IPA: [mɐˈtɛɛv ˈzalif]) is the 700 m wide cove indenting for 290 m the south coast of Livingston Island in the South Shetland Islands, Antarctica. Part of South Bay, entered east of Yasen Point. Aldan Rock (62°39′13.5″S 60°35′04.2″W) is the largest in a small group of rocks lying off the eastern part of the cove. The UK base camp Station P operated at the cove's head during the 1957/58 summer season.

The cove is named after the Bulgarian physicist Matey Mateev (1940–2010) for his support for the Bulgarian Antarctic programme.

== Location ==
Mateev Cove is located at 62°39′06″S 60°35′32″W. British mapping in 1968, Chilean in 1971, Argentine in 1980, and Bulgarian in 2005 and 2009.

== Maps ==
- L.L. Ivanov et al. Antarctica: Livingston Island and Greenwich Island, South Shetland Islands. Scale 1:100000 topographic map. Sofia: Antarctic Place-names Commission of Bulgaria, 2005.
- L.L. Ivanov. Antarctica: Livingston Island and Greenwich, Robert, Snow and Smith Islands. Scale 1:120000 topographic map. Troyan: Manfred Wörner Foundation, 2009. ISBN 978-954-92032-6-4
- Antarctic Digital Database (ADD). Scale 1:250000 topographic map of Antarctica. Scientific Committee on Antarctic Research (SCAR). Since 1993, regularly upgraded and updated.
- L.L. Ivanov. Antarctica: Livingston Island and Smith Island. Scale 1:100000 topographic map. Manfred Wörner Foundation, 2017. ISBN 978-619-90008-3-0
