= Walker Bay (Livingston Island) =

Bay along the south coast of Livingston Island

Location of Livingston Island in the South Shetland Islands.

Topographic map of Livingston Island.

Walker Bay (62°38′S 60°42′W) is a bay lying between John Beach and Hannah Point along the south coast of Livingston Island in the South Shetland Islands, Antarctica. The bay is fed by Verila Glacier.

It was named by the United Kingdom Antarctic Place-Names Committee (UK-APC) in 1958 for John Walker, Master of the sealer John who visited the South Shetland Islands in 1820-21 and provided George Powell with descriptions and sketches of their southern coasts for incorporation in his 1822 chart.

== Maps ==
- South Shetland Islands. Scale 1:200000 topographic map No. 5657. DOS 610 – W 62 60. Tolworth, UK, 1968.
- Islas Livingston y Decepción. Mapa topográfico a escala 1:100000. Madrid: Servicio Geográfico del Ejército, 1991.
- L.L. Ivanov et al. Antarctica: Livingston Island and Greenwich Island, South Shetland Islands. Scale 1:100000 topographic map. Sofia: Antarctic Place-names Commission of Bulgaria, 2005.
- L.L. Ivanov. Antarctica: Livingston Island and Greenwich, Robert, Snow and Smith Islands. Scale 1:120000 topographic map. Troyan: Manfred Wörner Foundation, 2009. ISBN 978-954-92032-6-4
- Antarctic Digital Database (ADD). Scale 1:250000 topographic map of Antarctica. Scientific Committee on Antarctic Research (SCAR), 1993–2016.
