= Ustra Peak =

Rocky peak in the South Shetland Islands, Antarctica

Location of Livingston Island in the South Shetland Islands.

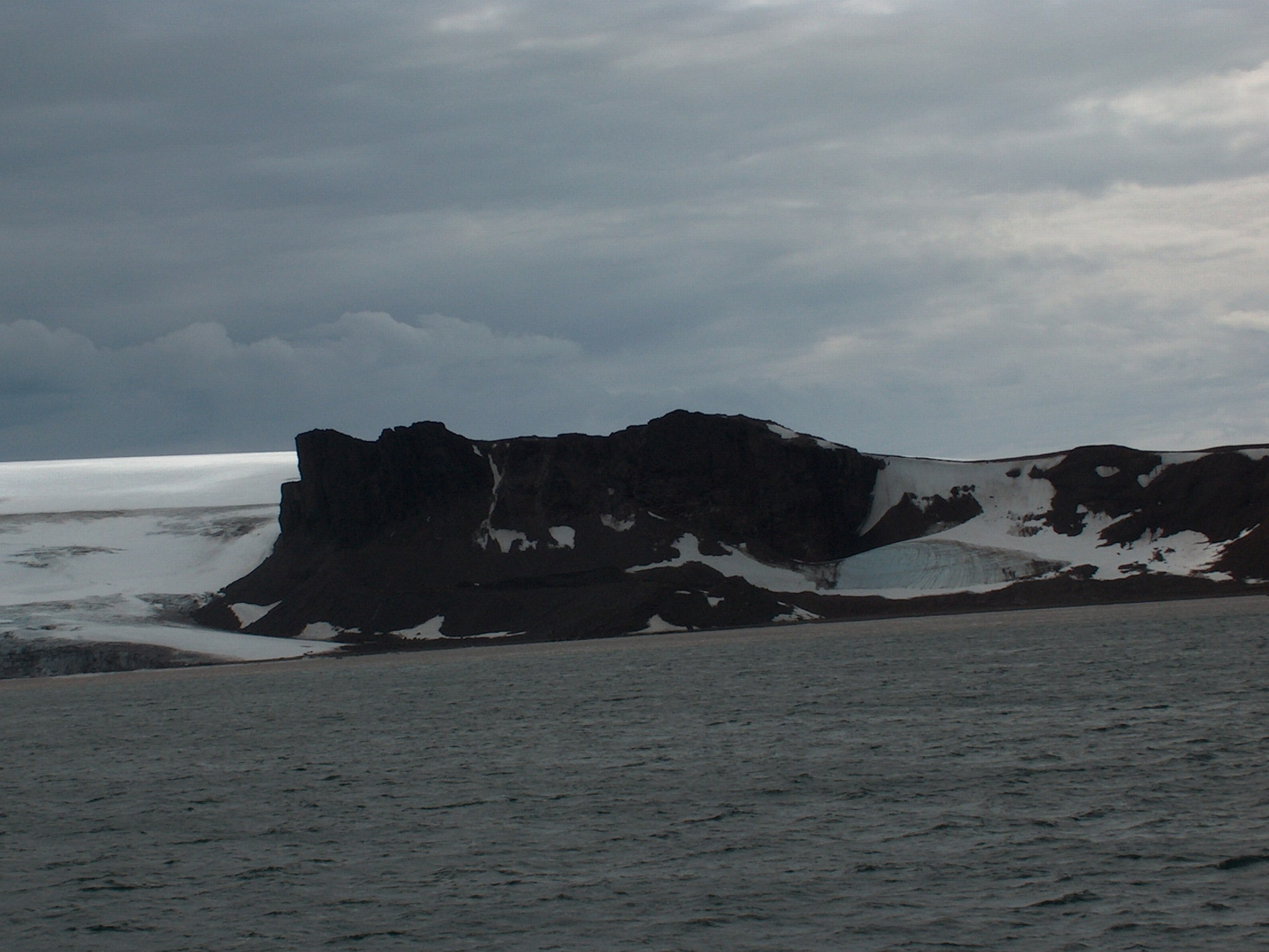
Ustra Peak from Walker Bay.

Topographic map of Livingston Island and Smith Island.

Ustra Peak (Bulgarian: връх Устра, romanized: vrah Ustra, IPA: [ˈvrɤx ˈustrɐ]) is a rocky peak of 195 m on the coast of Walker Bay, Livingston Island in the South Shetland Islands, Antarctica. The peak was named after the medieval Bulgarian fortress of Ustra in the Eastern Rhodope Mountains.

== Location ==
The peak is located at 62°38′26″S 60°35′57″W, which is next southeast of Verila Glacier, 2.1 km west of Krakra Bluff and 1.71 km north-northeast of Hannah Point. It was mapped by the British in 1968, and by the Bulgarians in 2005 and 2009.

== Maps ==
- L.L. Ivanov et al. Antarctica: Livingston Island and Greenwich Island, South Shetland Islands. Scale 1:100000 topographic map. Sofia: Antarctic Place-names Commission of Bulgaria, 2005.
- L.L. Ivanov. Antarctica: Livingston Island and Greenwich, Robert, Snow and Smith Islands. Scale 1:120000 topographic map. Troyan: Manfred Wörner Foundation, 2009. ISBN 978-954-92032-6-4
