= Matey Mateev =

Bulgarian professor of theoretical physics (1940–2010)

Matey Dragomirov Mateev
- Матей Драгомиров Матеев
- Born: 10 April 1940; Sofia, Bulgaria
- Died: 25 July 2010 (aged 70); Sofia, Bulgaria
- Education: Sofia University St. Kliment Ohridski
- Scientific career
- Fields: Theoretical physics
- Workplaces: Sofia University (SU) · Abdus Salam International Centre for Theoretical Physics (ICTP) · Joint Institute for Nuclear Research (JINR)

Matey Dragomirov Mateev (Bulgarian: Матей Драгомиров Матеев) (10 April 1940 – 25 July 2010) was a Bulgarian professor in theoretical physics. He was a fellow of the Bulgarian Academy of Sciences.

== Early life ==
Mateev was born in Sofia, Bulgaria. He studied nuclear physics at Sofia University where he became a research associate in the theoretical department.

== Career ==
He worked at Abdus Salam International Centre for Theoretical Physics (ICTP), Trieste (1967). He joined the Joint Institute for Nuclear Research in Dubna (1971–1980) where he received a Doctor of Philosophy in physics (Theoretical and Mathematical Physics) (1980).

In 1981 he became an associate professor and later a professor (highest academic rank) in 1984. From 1983 to 1985 he led the faculty of physics and was a member of the academic council and vice-rector of Sofia University from 1985 to 1986. From 1986 to 1989 Mateev was vice-chairman of the Scientific Committee for Higher Education. He was Minister of Education and Science in the 80th and 81st cabinets (November 22, 1990 - November 8, 1991). In 2003 he was selected as an academician in physics from the Bulgarian Academy of Sciences.

Academician Mateev was editor-in-chief of the Bulgarian Journal of Physics (BJP) and a member of the editorial board of Balkan Physics Letters.
