= Krakra Bluff =

Rocky bluff in the South Shetland Islands, Antarctica

Location of Livingston Island in the South Shetland Islands.

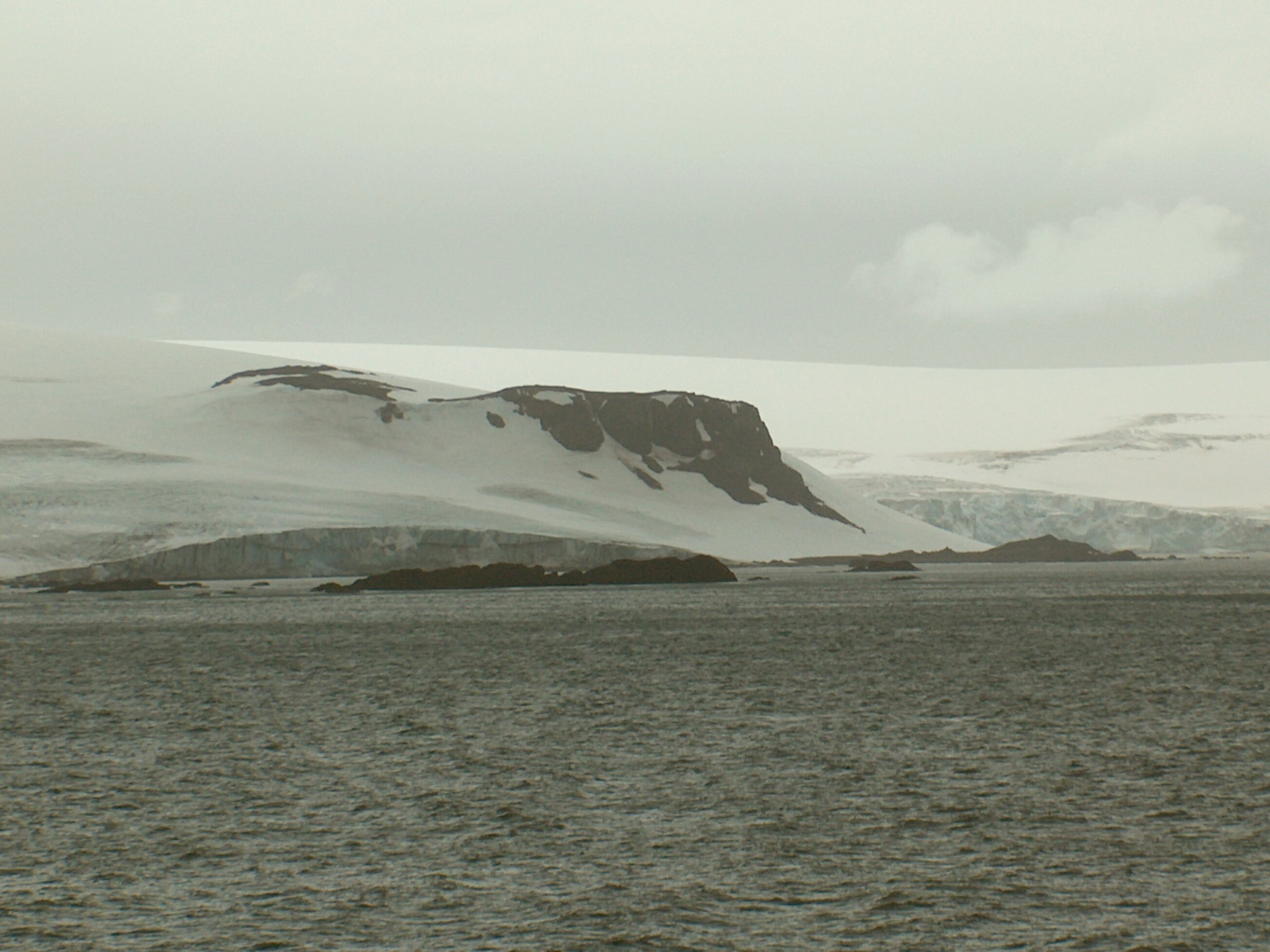
Krakra Bluff from South Bay, with Memorable Beach on the right and Aldan Rock in the foreground.

Topographic map of Livingston Island and Smith Island.

Krakra Bluff (Rid Krakra \'rid 'kra-kra\) is a rocky bluff of elevation 140 m surmounting Lukovo Point and Memorable Beach on the northwest coast of South Bay, Livingston Island in the South Shetland Islands, Antarctica. The area was visited by early 19th century sealers operating from nearby Johnsons Dock.

The feature is named after the Bulgarian bolyar (boyar) and warrior Krakra of Pernik (10-11th Century).

== Location ==
The bluff is located at 62°38′24″S 60°33′27″W which is 2.1 km east of Ustra Peak, and 5.1 km west of Ereby Point.

== See also ==
- South Bay
- Livingston Island

== Maps ==
- L.L. Ivanov et al. Antarctica: Livingston Island and Greenwich Island, South Shetland Islands. Scale 1:100000 topographic map. Sofia: Antarctic Place-names Commission of Bulgaria, 2005.
- L.L. Ivanov. Antarctica: Livingston Island and Greenwich, Robert, Snow and Smith Islands. Scale 1:120000 topographic map. Troyan: Manfred Wörner Foundation, 2009.
