= Bond Point =

Small ice-free headland on the south coast of western Livingston Island

Location of Livingston Island in the South Shetland Islands.

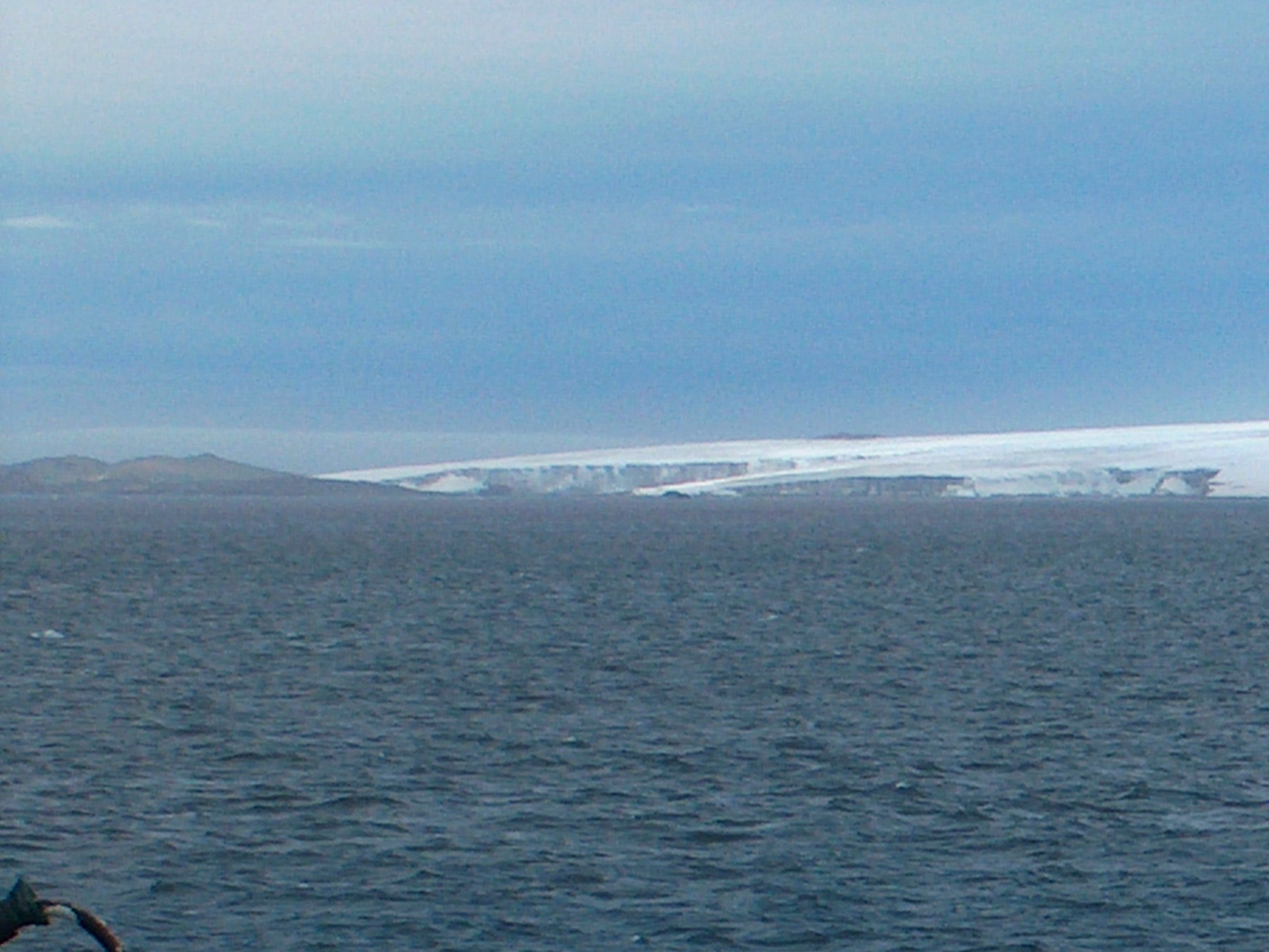
Bond Point (in the centre) from near Hannah Point, with Elephant Point on the left.

Topographic map of Livingston Island, Greenwich, Robert, Snow and Smith Islands.

Bond Point is a small ice-free headland on the south coast of western Livingston Island in the South Shetland Islands, Antarctica forming the northeast side of the entrance to Kavarna Cove. Linzipar Lake is situated at the point's base. The area was visited by early 19th century sealers.

The feature is named after Captain Ralph Bond, Master of the British sealing vessel Hetty who operated in the South Shetlands in 1820-21 and provided Captain George Powell with descriptions of their south coasts for incorporation in his 1822 chart.

== Location ==
The point is located at 62°40′40″S 60°48′26″W which is 3.1 km northeast of Elephant Point and 10.27 km west-southwest of Hannah Point (British mapping in 1822 and 1968, Chilean in 1971, Argentine in 1980, Spanish in 1991, and Bulgarian in 2009).

== Maps ==
- Chart of South Shetland including Coronation Island, &c. from the exploration of the sloop Dove in the years 1821 and 1822 by George Powell Commander of the same. Scale ca. 1:200000. London: Laurie, 1822.
- L.L. Ivanov et al. Antarctica: Livingston Island and Greenwich Island, South Shetland Islands. Scale 1:100000 topographic map. Sofia: Antarctic Place-names Commission of Bulgaria, 2005.
- L.L. Ivanov. Antarctica: Livingston Island and Greenwich, Robert, Snow and Smith Islands. Scale 1:120000 topographic map. Troyan: Manfred Wörner Foundation, 2009. ISBN 978-954-92032-6-4
