= Hannah Point =

Point on Livingston Island, South Shetland Islands

Location of Livingston Island in the South Shetland Islands

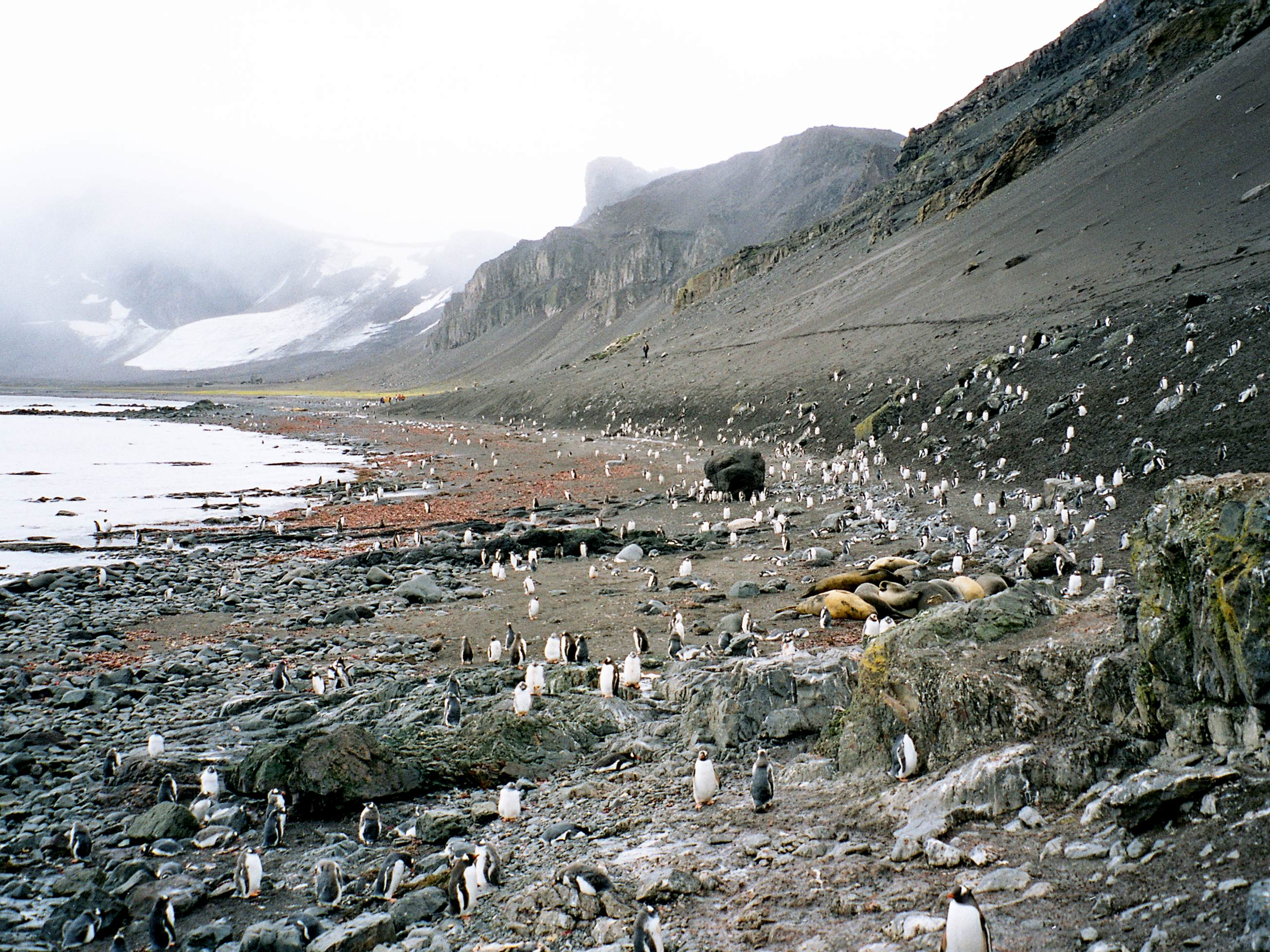
Tourist walk at Liverpool Beach, Hannah Point

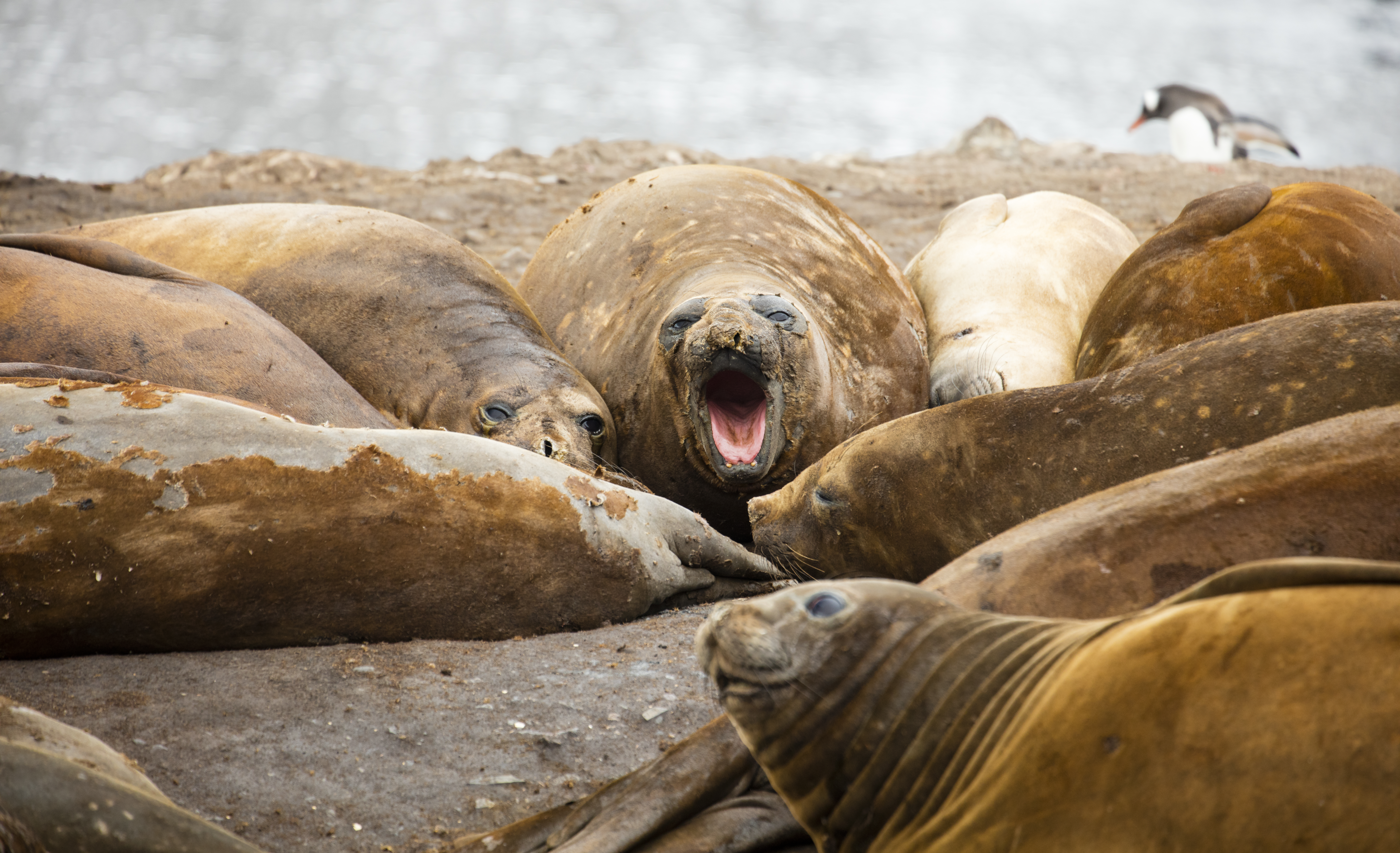
Elephant seals at Hannah Point

Topographic map of Livingston Island

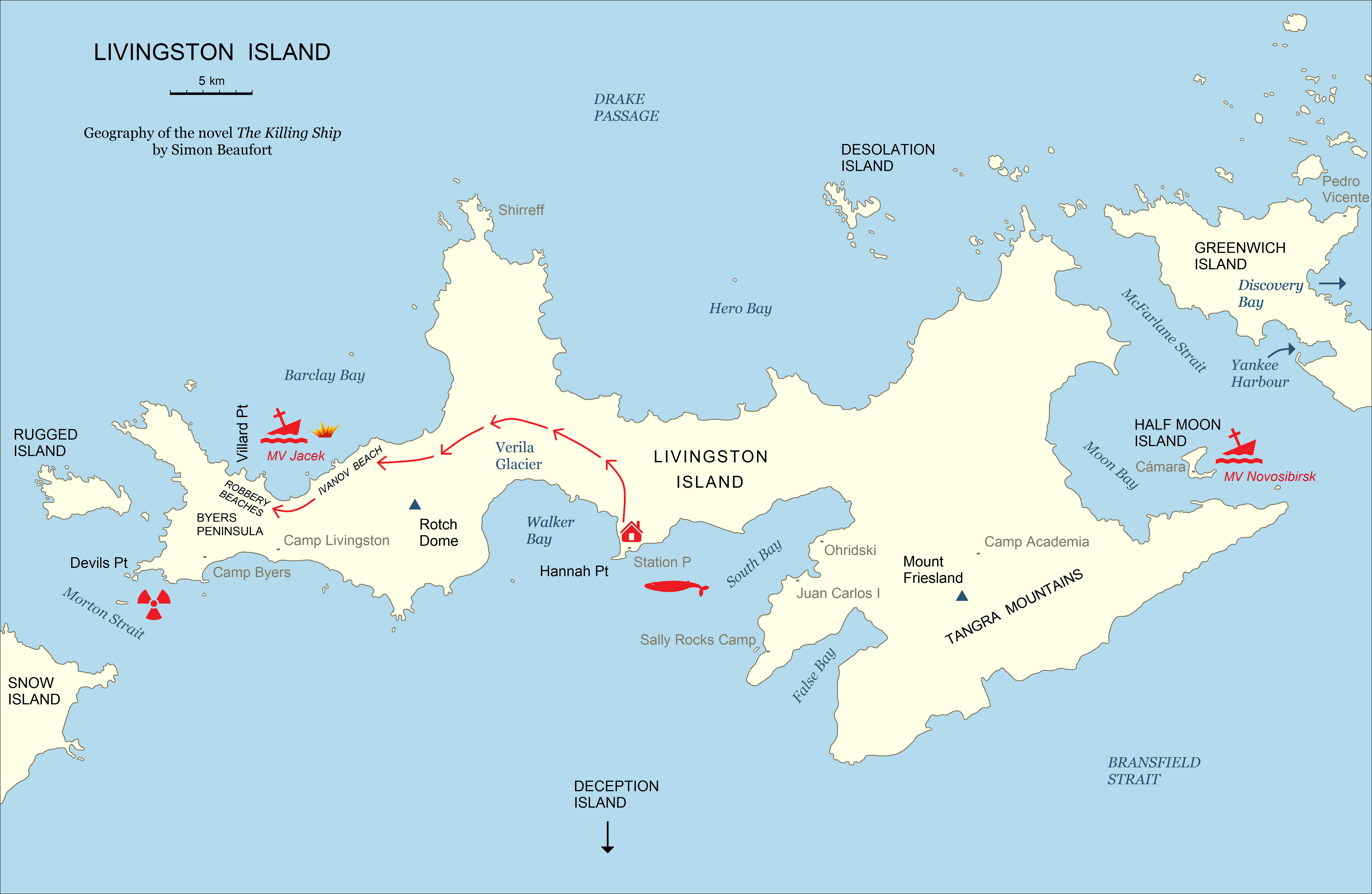
Geography of the thriller novel The Killing Ship by Simon Beaufort

Hannah Point is a point on the south coast of Livingston Island in the South Shetland Islands, Antarctica. It forms the east side of the entrance to Walker Bay and the west side of the entrance to South Bay. Surmounted by Ustra Peak to the north, with Liverpool Beach extending between the peak and the tip of Hannah Point. Ice-free area ca. 122 hectares (300 acres).

The area was visited by early 19th century sealers frequenting nearby Johnsons Dock. The British base camp Station P on the east side of Hannah Point operated from 29 December 1957 until 15 March 1958.

Among the birds that make their home here are the gentoo and macaroni penguins as well as kelp gulls. Southern giant petrels nest here as do blue-eyed shags, skuas, and snowy sheathbills. Southern elephant seals and Antarctic fur seals are among the larger life forms observed at the point.

Hannah Point is one of the most popular Antarctic tourist sites frequented by cruise ships.

The geographical feature is named after the British sealing vessel Hannah hailing from Liverpool and wrecked in the vicinity in 1820 while operating in the South Shetlands.

== Location ==
The point is located at 62°39′16″S 60°36′48″W which is 13.95 km northeast of Elephant Point, 8.16 km west-southwest of Ereby Point, 12.36 km west-southwest of Hespérides Point and 11.76 km northwest of Miers Bluff (British mapping in 1821, 1962 and 1968, Argentine in 1959 and 1980, Chilean in 1971, Spanish in 1991, and Bulgarian in 2005 and 2009).

== Maps ==
- L.L. Ivanov et al. Antarctica: Livingston Island and Greenwich Island, South Shetland Islands. Scale 1:100000 topographic map. Sofia: Antarctic Place-names Commission of Bulgaria, 2005.
- L.L. Ivanov. Antarctica: Livingston Island and Greenwich, Robert, Snow and Smith Islands. Scale 1:120000 topographic map. Troyan: Manfred Wörner Foundation, 2009. ISBN 978-954-92032-6-4
- Antarctic Digital Database (ADD). Scale 1:250000 topographic map of Antarctica. Scientific Committee on Antarctic Research (SCAR). Since 1993, regularly upgraded and updated.
- L.L. Ivanov. Antarctica: Livingston Island and Smith Island. Scale 1:100000 topographic map. Manfred Wörner Foundation, 2017. ISBN 978-619-90008-3-0

== In fiction ==
Hannah Point is part of the mise-en-scène of the Antarctica thriller novel The Killing Ship authored by Elizabeth Cruwys and Beau Riffenburgh (under their joint alias Simon Beaufort) in 2016, with action spreading from a field camp at the point westwards to Villard Point on Byers Peninsula via Ivanov Beach.
