= Chapman Rocks =

Group of rocks in the South Shetland Islands, Antarctica

- Location of Livingston Island in the South Shetland Islands

- Location within Antarctic Peninsula Location within Antarctica

Geography
- Location: Antarctica
- Coordinates: 62°29′42.8″S 60°28′55.4″W
- Archipelago: South Shetland Islands

Administration
- Antarctica
- Administered under the Antarctic Treaty System

Demographics
- Population: uninhabited

Chapman Rocks is a group of rocks in central Hero Bay on the north side of Livingston Island in the South Shetland Islands, Antarctica. The area was visited by early 19th century sealers operating from nearby Blythe Bay.

The feature is named after Thomas Chapman, English trunk-maker of Southwark who in 1795 discovered a method of processing fur seal skins for use in the hat trade, thus initiating the industry in London.

== Location ==
The rocks are located at 62°29′42.8″S 60°28′55.4″W which is 6.05 km (3.76 mi) north-northwest of Siddins Point, 6.03 km (3.75 mi) northeast of Lynx Rocks, 12.09 km (7.51 mi) east of Black Point, 7.97 km (4.95 mi) west-southwest of Iratais Point, Desolation Island, 7.6 km (4.7 mi) west-southwest of Miladinovi Islets, 7.28 km (4.52 mi) west by south of Koynare Rocks and 5.23 km (3.25 mi) northwest of Belchin Rock (British mapping in 1968, Chilean in 1971, Argentine in 1980, and Bulgarian in 2009).

== See also ==
- Composite Antarctic Gazetteer
- List of Antarctic islands south of 60° S
- SCAR
- Territorial claims in Antarctica

== Maps ==
- L.L. Ivanov. Antarctica: Livingston Island and Greenwich, Robert, Snow and Smith Islands. Scale 1:120000 topographic map. Troyan: Manfred Wörner Foundation, 2009. ISBN 978-954-92032-6-4
