= Boynik Point =

Rounded rocky point in the entrance to Hero Bay, Livingston Island in Antarctica

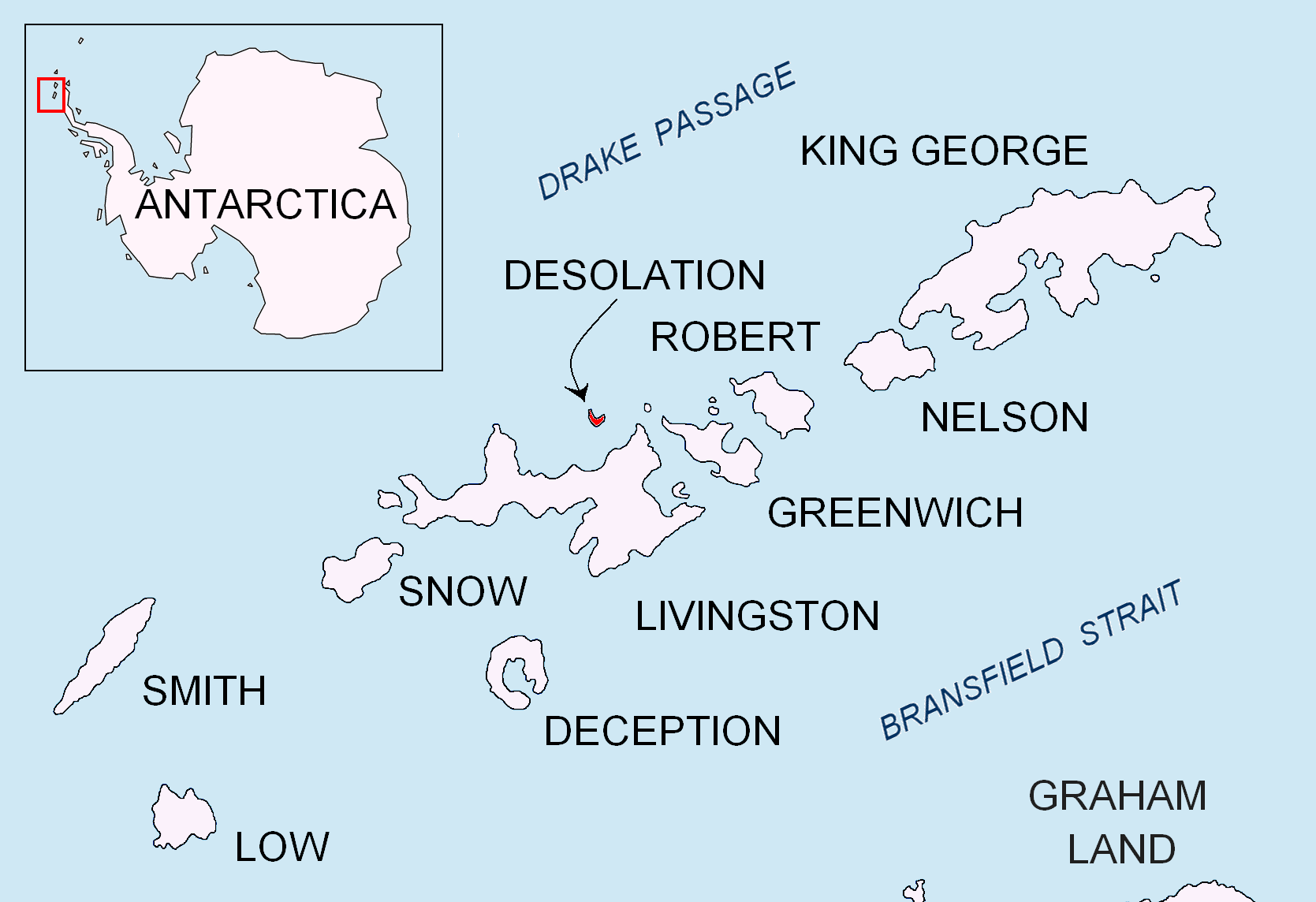
Location of Desolation Island in the South Shetland Islands

Topographic map of Livingston Island

Boynik Point (Bulgarian: нос Бойник, ‘Nos Boynik’ \'nos 'boy-nik\) is the rounded rocky point on the southeast side of the entrance to Kozma Cove, forming the northeast extremity of Desolation Island in the entrance to Hero Bay, Livingston Island in Antarctica. The feature is named after the settlement of Boynik in Southern Bulgaria.

== Location ==
Boynik Point is located at 62°27′07″S 60°18′38″W, which is 3.2 km east-southeast of Cape Danger, and 9 km west of Williams Point, 7.6 km northwest of Kotis Point and 12.15 km northeast of Siddins Point on Livingston Island. British mapping in 1968, and Bulgarian in 2005, 2009 and 2017.

== Maps ==
- L.L. Ivanov et al. Antarctica: Livingston Island and Greenwich Island, South Shetland Islands. Scale 1:100000 topographic map. Sofia: Antarctic Place-names Commission of Bulgaria, 2005.
- L.L. Ivanov. Antarctica: Livingston Island and Greenwich, Robert, Snow and Smith Islands. Scale 1:120000 topographic map. Troyan: Manfred Wörner Foundation, 2009.
- Antarctic Digital Database (ADD). Scale 1:250000 topographic map of Antarctica. Scientific Committee on Antarctic Research (SCAR). Since 1993, regularly upgraded and updated
