= Indian Rocks =

Rocky islets of the South Shetland Islands

Location of Livingston Island in the South Shetland Islands.

Topographic map of Livingston Island, Greenwich, Robert, Snow and Smith Islands.

Indian Rocks is a group of rocks in eastern Hero Bay on the north side of Livingston Island in the South Shetland Islands, Antarctica. The area was visited by early 19th century sealers operating from Blythe Bay.

The feature is named after the British sealing vessel Indian under Captain Spiller that visited the South Shetlands in 1820-21 and brought back some of the crew of the wrecked ship Cora from nearby Desolation Island.

== Location ==
The rocks are located at 62°29′08.9″S 60°16′19.4″W which is 1.15 km east of Wood Island, 4.04 km west-southwest of Balsha Island, Dunbar Islands, 3.62 km northwest of Kotis Point and 3.76 km north-northwest of Bezmer Point (British mapping in 1821 and 1968, Chilean in 1971, Argentine in 1980, and Bulgarian in 2009).

== Maps ==
- L.L. Ivanov. Antarctica: Livingston Island and Greenwich, Robert, Snow and Smith Islands. Scale 1:120000 topographic map. Troyan: Manfred Wörner Foundation, 2009. ISBN 978-954-92032-6-4
