= Burel Hill =

Ice-free hill on Desolation Island

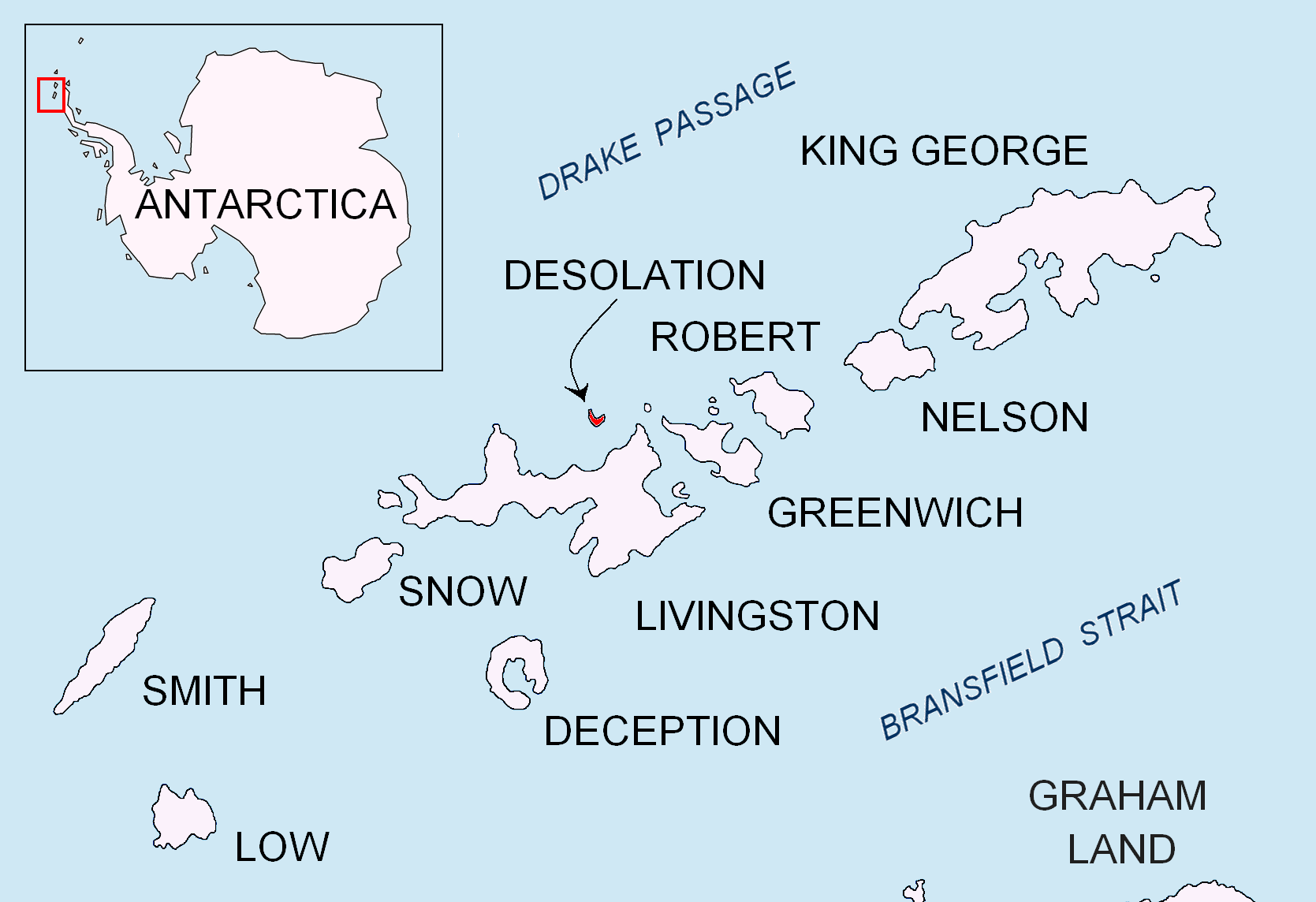
Location of Desolation Island in the South Shetland Islands.

Topographic map of Livingston Island and Smith Island.

Burel Hill (Bulgarian: хълм Бурел, ‘Halm Burel’ \'h&lm 'bu-rel\) is an ice-free hill rising 152 metres (499 ft) in the northwest part of Desolation Island off Livingston Island in the South Shetland Islands, Antarctica. It surmounts Kozma Cove to the east, and Hero Bay to the south and southwest.

The hill is named after the Burel region in Western Bulgaria.

== Location ==
Burel Hill is located at 62°27′12.6″S 60°21′35″W, which is 2.1 km (1.3 mi) north-northwest of Iratais Point and 1.2 km (0.75 mi) south-southeast of Cape Danger. It was mapped in 1968 by the British, and in 2005 and 2009 by Bulgaria.

== Maps ==
- L.L. Ivanov et al. Antarctica: Livingston Island and Greenwich Island, South Shetland Islands. Scale 1:100000 topographic map. Sofia: Antarctic Place-names Commission of Bulgaria, 2005.
- L.L. Ivanov. Antarctica: Livingston Island and Greenwich, Robert, Snow and Smith Islands. Scale 1:120000 topographic map. Troyan: Manfred Wörner Foundation, 2009. ISBN 978-954-92032-6-4
- Antarctic Digital Database (ADD). Scale 1:250000 topographic map of Antarctica. Scientific Committee on Antarctic Research (SCAR). Since 1993, regularly upgraded and updated.
- L.L. Ivanov. Antarctica: Livingston Island and Smith Island. Scale 1:100000 topographic map. Manfred Wörner Foundation, 2017. ISBN 978-619-90008-3-0
