= Wood Island (Livingston Island) =

Island in the South Shetland Islands, Antarctica

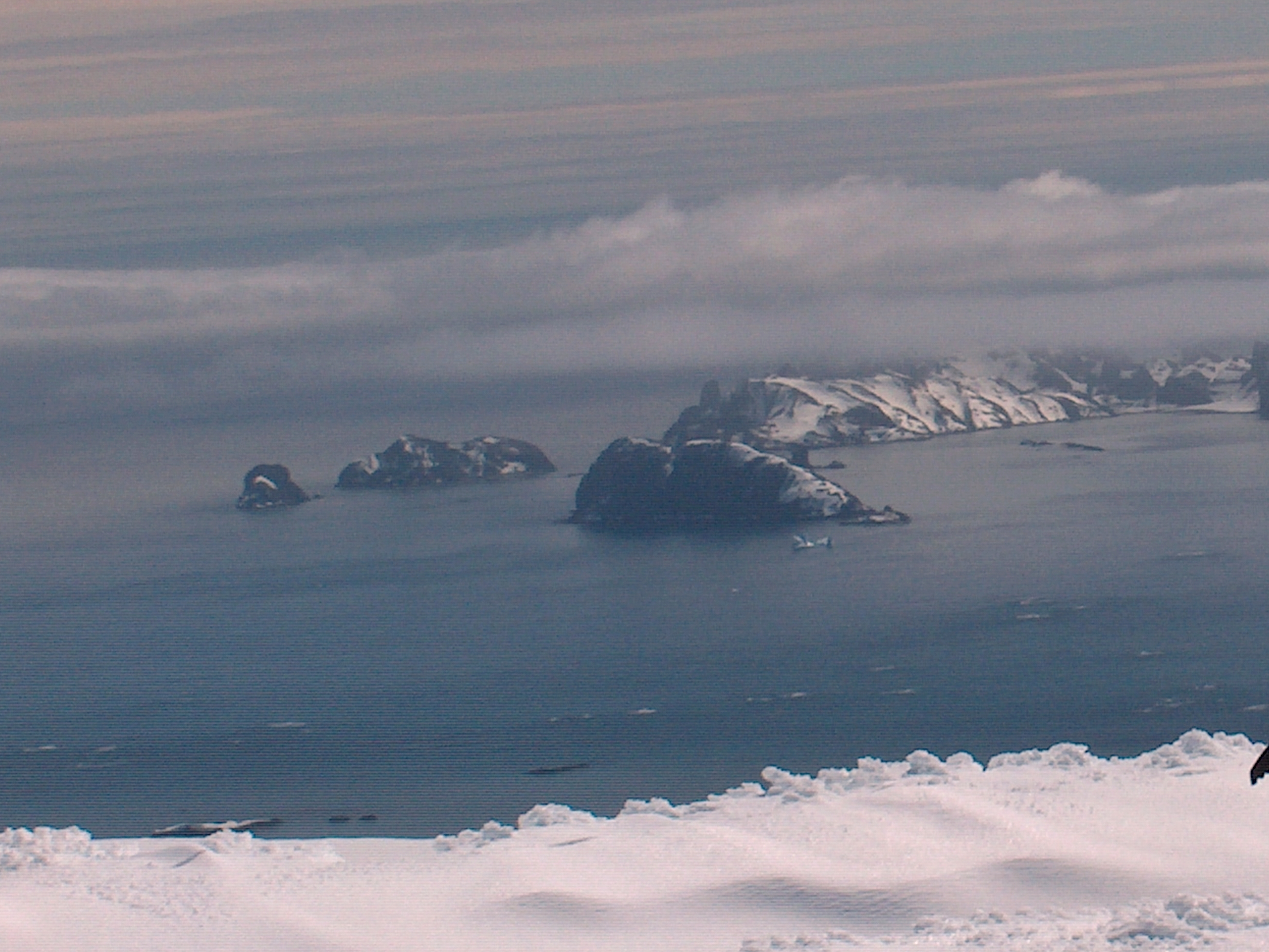
- Wood Island (in the centre) from Zemen Knoll, Livingston Island, with Miladinovi Islets to the left and Desolation Island on the right.

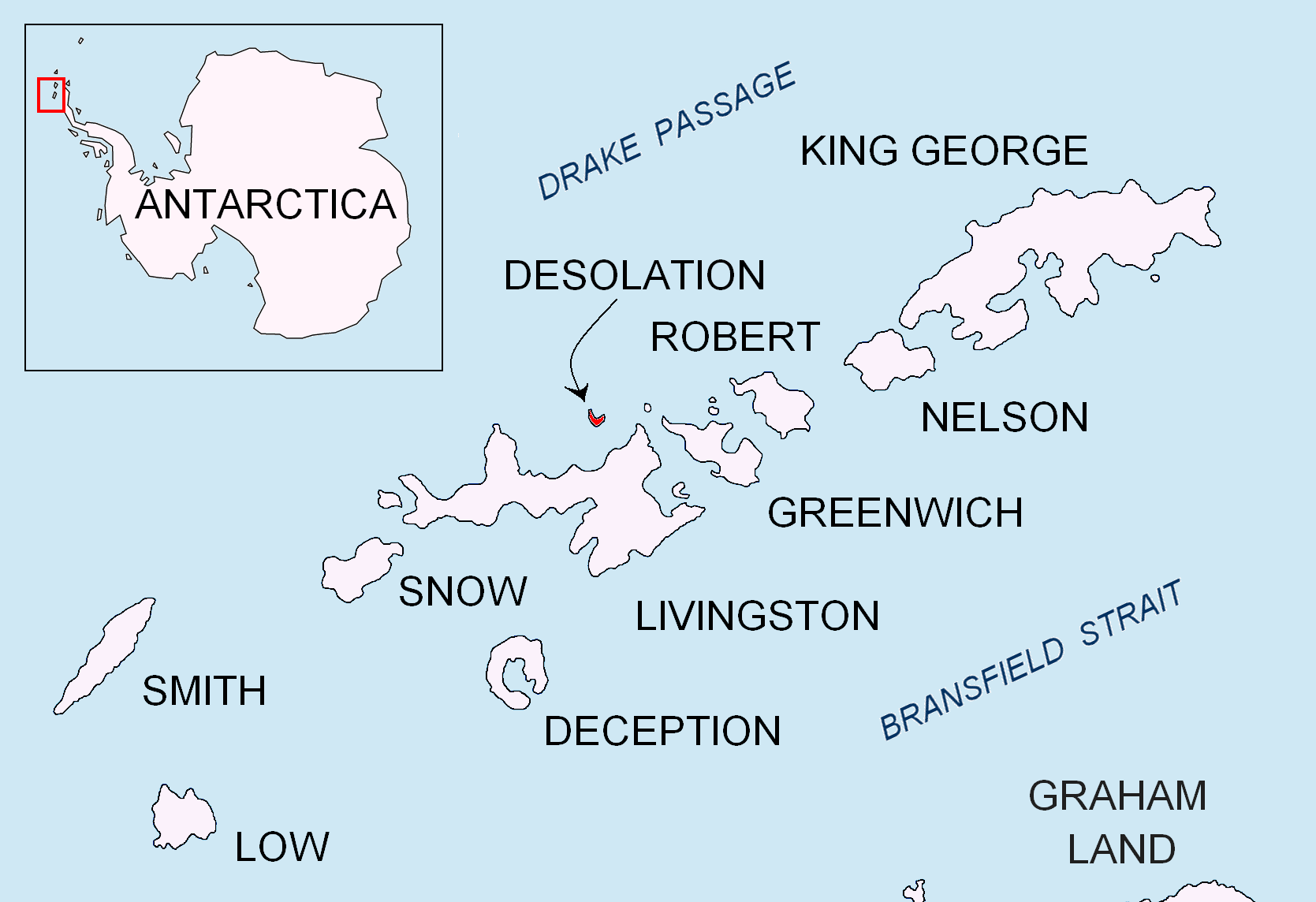
- Location of Desolation Island in the South Shetland Islands

- Location on Antarctic Peninsula Location in Antarctica

Geography
- Location: Antarctica
- Coordinates: 62°29′02.7″S 60°18′15.1″W
- Archipelago: South Shetland Islands
- Area: 14 ha (35 acres)

Administration
- Administered under the Antarctic Treaty System

Demographics
- Population: Uninhabited

Wood Island is a conspicuous rocky island in Hero Bay, Livingston Island in the South Shetland Islands, Antarctica lying southeast of Desolation Island and Miladinovi Islets and forming the south side of Blythe Bay. Surface area 14 hectares (35 acres).) The area was frequented by early nineteenth century English and American sealers operating from Blythe Bay.

The feature's name derives from the name 'Wood Harbour' or 'Port Wood' originally applied to Blythe Bay by Captain Robert Fildes in December 1820.

== Location ==
The island is centred at 62°29′02.7″S 60°18′15.1″W which is 1.7 km (1.1 mi) east-southeast of Miladinovi Islets, 2.38 km (1.48 mi) southeast of Iratais Point, Desolation Island, 9.33 km (5.80 mi) southwest of Williams Point, 5.2 km (3.2 mi) west-northwest of Kotis Point, 4.65 km (2.89 mi) northwest of Bezmer Point and 9.55 km (5.93 mi) northeast of Siddins Point, the last four points lying on Livingston Island (British mapping in 1821 and 1935, and Bulgarian in 2005 and 2009).

Topographic map of Livingston Island, Greenwich, Robert, Snow and Smith Islands.

== See also ==
- Composite Antarctic Gazetteer
- List of Antarctic islands south of 60° S
- SCAR
- Territorial claims in Antarctica

== Map ==
- L.L. Ivanov et al., Antarctica: Livingston Island and Greenwich Island, South Shetland Islands (from English Strait to Morton Strait, with illustrations and ice-cover distribution), Scale 1:100000 map, Antarctic Place-names Commission of Bulgaria, Ministry of Foreign Affairs, Sofia, 2005
