= Craggy Island (Livingston Island) =

Antarctic island

- Location of Livingstone Island in the South Shetland Islands

- Location within Antarctic Peninsula Location within Antarctica

Geography
- Location: Antarctica
- Coordinates: 62°27′43.5″S 60°17′37.3″W
- Archipelago: South Shetland Islands
- Area: 9 ha (22 acres)

Administration
- Administered under the Antarctic Treaty System

Demographics
- Population: Uninhabited

Craggy Island is a narrow island marked by crags, lying in Hero Bay, Livingston Island in the South Shetland Islands, Antarctica and forming the northeast side of Blythe Bay. Its surface area is 9 hectares (22 acres).) The area was frequented by early nineteenth century English and American sealers operating from Blythe Bay.

The feature was charted and named descriptively by the Discovery Investigations in 1935.

== Location ==
The island is centered at 62°27′43.5″S 60°17′37.3″W which is 900 m (980 yd) east-southeast of Desolation Island, 8.2 km (5.1 mi) west-southwest of Williams Point, 5.98 km (3.72 mi) northwest of Kotis Point, 6.5 km (4.0 mi) north-northwest of Bezmer Point, 2.2 km (1.4 mi) north by east of Wood Island, Livingston Island and 11.64 km (7.23 mi) northeast of Siddins Point (British mapping in 1821, 1935, 1948 and 1968, Argentine in 1954, Chilean in 1971, and Bulgarian in 2005 and 2009).

== See also ==
- Composite Antarctic Gazetteer
- List of Antarctic islands south of 60° S
- SCAR
- Territorial claims in Antarctica

== Map ==
- L.L. Ivanov et al. Antarctica: Livingston Island and Greenwich Island, South Shetland Islands. Scale 1:100000 topographic map. Sofia: Antarctic Place-names Commission of Bulgaria, 2005.
