= Eliza Rocks =

Group of rocks in the South Shetland Islands, Antarctica

- Location of Eliza Rocks

- Location within Antarctic Peninsula Location within Antarctica

Geography
- Location: Antarctica
- Coordinates: 62°26′07″S 60°13′05″W
- Archipelago: South Shetland Islands

Administration
- Antarctica
- Administered under the Antarctic Treaty System

Demographics
- Population: uninhabited

Eliza Rocks is a chain of rocks lying between Desolation Island and Zed Islands off the north coast of Livingston Island in the South Shetland Islands, Antarctica and extending 1 km in west-northwest direction. The area was visited by early 19th century sealers operating from Blythe Bay, Desolation Island.

The feature is named after the British sealing ship Eliza under Captain John Wright that was moored in Blythe Bay during part of the 1821–22 season.

== Location ==
The rocks are located on 62°26′07″S 60°13′05″W which is 1.9 km (1.18 mi) southwest of Esperanto Island, Zed Islands, 4.61 km (2.86 mi) northwest of Williams Point, 4.12 km (2.56 mi) north-northwest of Balsha Island, Dunbar Islands, 6.27 km (3.90 mi) east-northeast of Indian Rocks and 5.03 km (3.13 mi) northeast of Desolation Island (British mapping in 1962 and 1968, Chilean in 1971, Argentine in 1980, and Bulgarian in 2009).

Topographic map of Livingston Island, Greenwich, Robert, Snow and Smith Islands.

== See also ==
- Composite Antarctic Gazetteer
- List of Antarctic islands south of 60° S
- SCAR
- Territorial claims in Antarctica

== Maps ==
- L.L. Ivanov. Antarctica: Livingston Island and Greenwich, Robert, Snow and Smith Islands. Scale 1:120000 topographic map. Troyan: Manfred Wörner Foundation, 2009. ISBN 978-954-92032-6-4
