= Cora Cove =

Cove in the South Shetland Islands, Antarctica

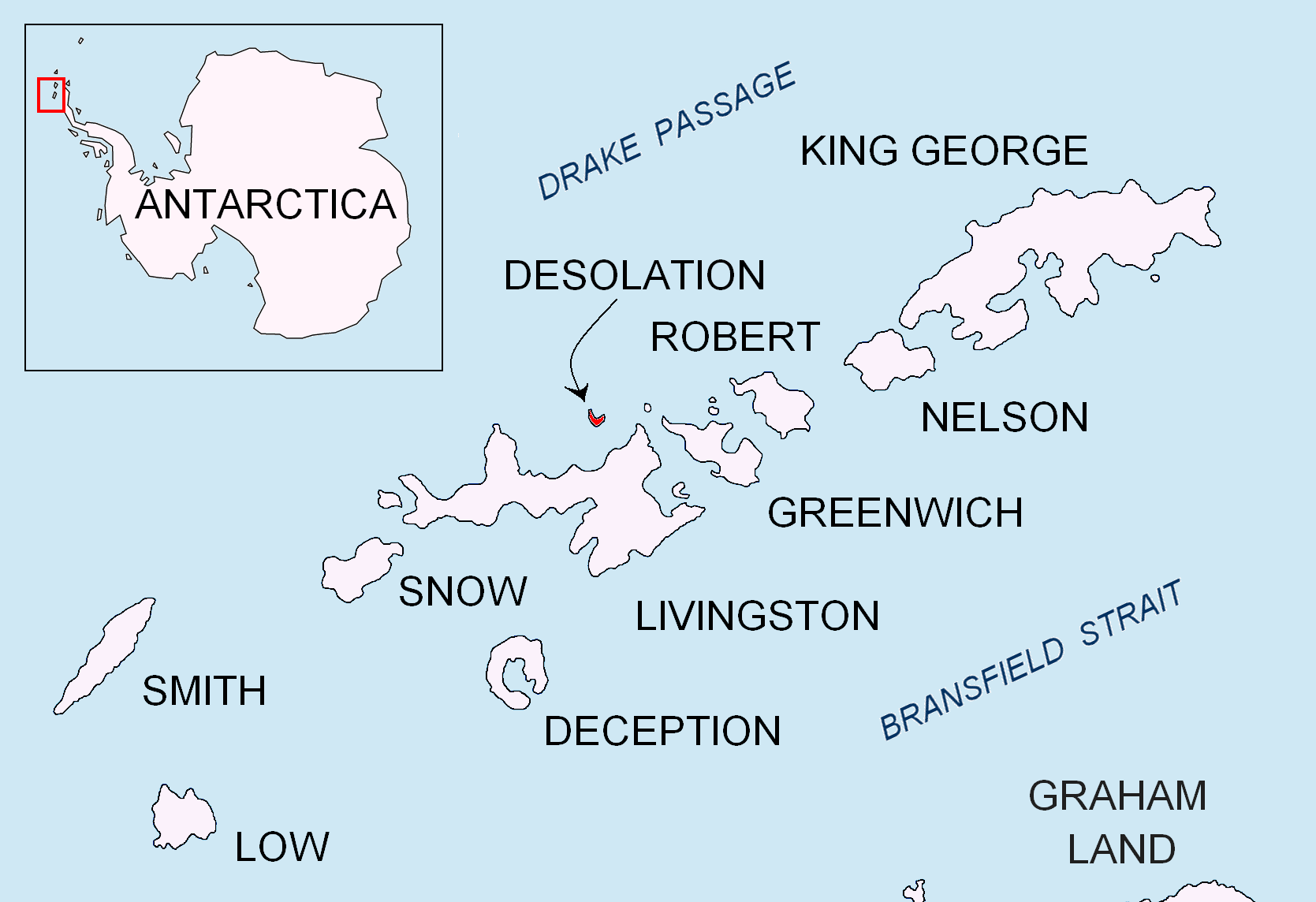
Location of Desolation Island in the South Shetland Islands.

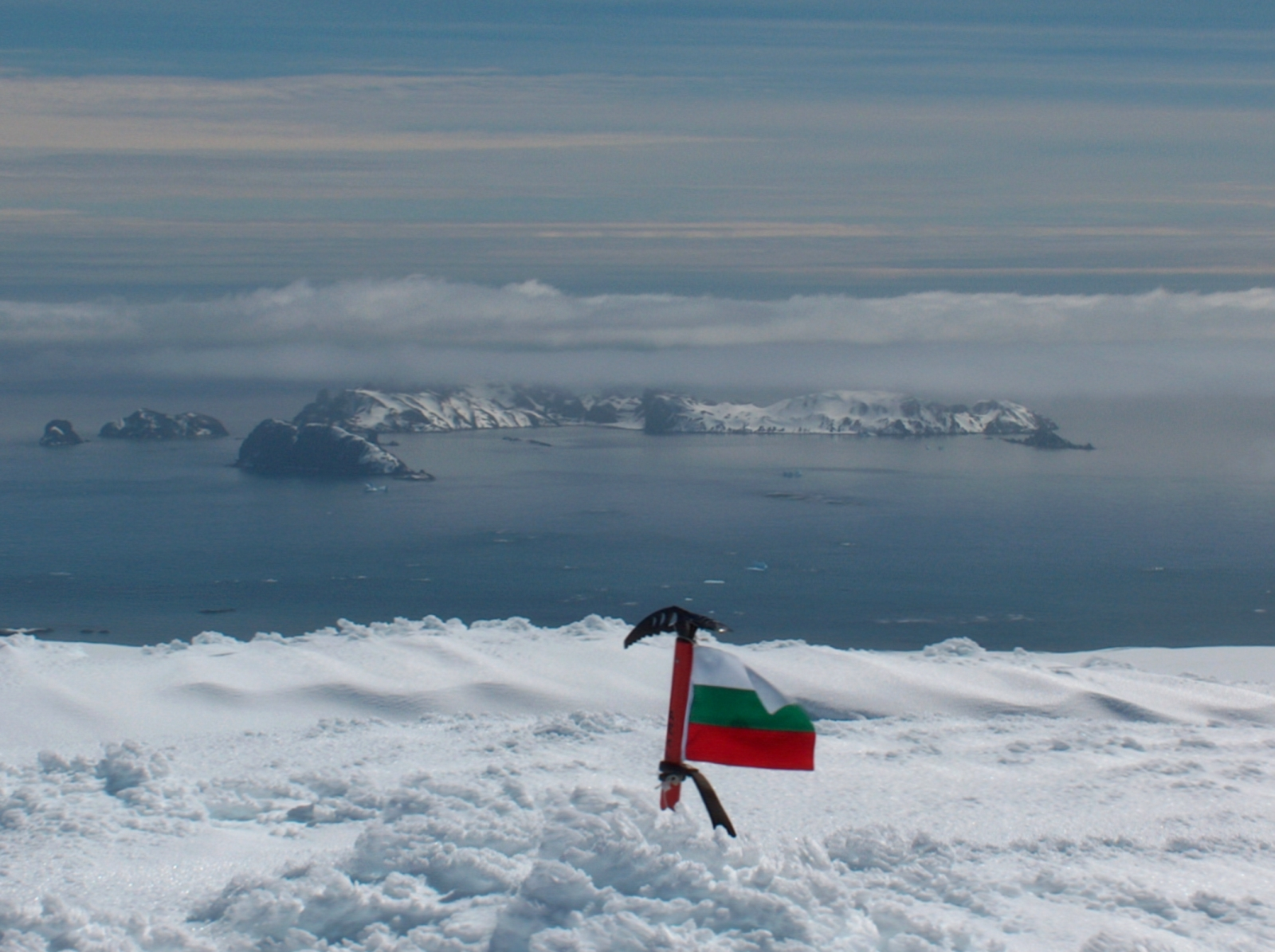
Desolation Island with Cora Cove in the centre from Vidin Heights, Livingston Island.

Topographic map of Livingston Island, Greenwich, Robert, Snow and Smith Islands.

Cora Cove is the 750 m wide cove in the northwest part of Blythe Bay indenting for 590 m the southeast coast of Desolation Island off Livingston Island in the South Shetland Islands, Antarctica. The cove was used by early 19th century sealers operating from Blythe Bay.

The feature is named after the British brig Cora (Captain Robert Fildes) lost there on 6 January 1821. Later that year Captain George Powell visited and charted the cove; he also reported the loss.

== Location ==
The cove is centred at 62°27′45.5″S 60°19′53.8″W which is 830 m north-northeast of Iratais Point, 2.92 km southeast of Cape Danger and 10.13 km south by west of Williams Point (British mapping in 1821, 1822, 1935, 1962 and 1968, French in 1937, Argentine in 1953, and Bulgarian in 2005 and 2009).

== Maps ==
- Chart of South Shetland including Coronation Island, &c. from the exploration of the sloop Dove in the years 1821 and 1822 by George Powell Commander of the same. Scale ca. 1:200000. London: Laurie, 1822.
- L.L. Ivanov et al. Antarctica: Livingston Island and Greenwich Island, South Shetland Islands. Scale 1:100000 topographic map. Sofia: Antarctic Place-names Commission of Bulgaria, 2005.
- L.L. Ivanov. Antarctica: Livingston Island and Greenwich, Robert, Snow and Smith Islands. Scale 1:120000 topographic map. Troyan: Manfred Wörner Foundation, 2009. ISBN 978-954-92032-6-4
