= Robert Fildes =

- Born: 13 July 1793; Liverpool, England
- Died: 28 December 1827 (aged 34)
- Occupations: Merchant captain, sealer
- Years active: 1814–1827
- Known for: British sealing voyages to the South Shetland Islands (1820–22); first sailing directions for the islands; naming Livingston Island
- Notable work: Log and journal of the brig Cora (1820–21)

Robert Fildes (13 July 1793 – 28 December 1827) was a British merchant captain and sealer from Liverpool who led two of the earliest British sealing voyages to the South Shetland Islands. His journal is a key source for the activity of several sealers there in 1820–21, including the Dragón de Valparaíso under Andrew MacFarlane.

== Early life ==
Fildes was born in Liverpool on 13 July 1793 and commanded merchant vessels from 1814. His career changed direction in 1820, when news of William Smith's discovery of the South Shetland Islands reached England and shipowners learned that a quick profit could be made from the islands' fur seals. His father-in-law, the Liverpool shipowner Henry Wood, bought the brig Cora and appointed Fildes master.

== 1820–21 voyage ==
Voyage of the Dragon de Valparaiso (1820–1821) Andrew MacFarlane, possible first landing on the Antarctic mainland.

The Cora sailed from Liverpool and visited the Falkland Islands and the South Shetland Islands. Fildes's log and journal, covering 6 October 1820 to 13 January 1821, is held at The National Archives. On 16 December 1820 at Deception Island he met the Dragón de Valparaíso. According to his notes, MacFarlane, whom he described as "a very intelligent man", told him that he had landed on the land south of the island. Chilean historians have cited this account as evidence of the first recorded landing on the Antarctic continent.

Cora was wrecked at Desolation Island on 6 January 1821, in what was later named Cora Cove. While living in a hut made from the wreck, Fildes prepared several charts and the first sailing directions for the islands. In them he introduced the name Livingston Island for the second-largest island of the group, until then known as Friesland Island. He and some of the crew were taken back to Liverpool aboard the Indian.

== 1821–22 voyage ==
The Cora voyage had brought Fildes a financial loss. Wood then offered him command of the brig Robert, and Fildes led a second sealing voyage from Liverpool. The expedition visited the Falkland Islands, and Fildes wrote a comprehensive report on the South Shetland Islands. Robert was moored in Clothier Harbour for most of the summer. Damaged by ice, she was lost in March 1822, on 7 March according to Lloyd's List; her crew were saved.

== Later life and death ==
After a brief period of unemployment on his return to England, Fildes became master of the brig Frances Ernest, a command he held for four years. He died on 28 December 1827, shortly after the brig was badly damaged in a severe storm.

== Legacy ==
Fildes Strait, between King George Island and Nelson Island, is probably named after him, as is Fildes Peninsula at the southwestern end of King George Island. His papers, dating from 1820 to 1829, are held by the Scott Polar Research Institute, University of Cambridge.
