= Craggy Island (disambiguation) =

Craggy Island is the fictional location of comedy television series Father Ted. It is also the name of non-fictional locations:

- Craggy Island (Livingston Island), in the subantarctic South Shetland Islands
- Craggy Island (Tasmania)
