= Koynare Rocks =

Rocks in the South Shetland Islands, Antarctica

- Location of Livingston Island in the South Shetland Islands

- Location on Antarctic Peninsula Location in Antarctica

Geography
- Location: Antarctica
- Coordinates: 62°29′33″S 60°20′27″W
- Archipelago: South Shetland Islands

Administration
- Antarctica
- Administered under the Antarctic Treaty System

Demographics
- Population: 0

Koynare Rocks (Bulgarian: скали Койнаре, ‘Skali Koynare’ ska-'li koy-'na-re) are a small group of rocks in Hero Bay off the north coast Livingston Island in the South Shetland Islands, Antarctica situated 7.5 km (4.66 mi) northeast of Siddins Point, 5.3 km (3.29 mi) northwest of Bezmer Point, and 1.4 km (0.87 mi) south of Miladinovi Islets. The area was visited by early 19th century sealers.

The rocks are named after the town of Koynare in northwestern Bulgaria.

== Location ==
Koynare Rocks are located at 62°29′33″S 60°20′27″W (Bulgarian mapping in 2009).

Topographic map of Livingston Island, Greenwich, Robert, Snow and Smith Islands

== See also ==
- Composite Antarctic Gazetteer
- List of Antarctic islands south of 60° S
- SCAR
- Territorial claims in Antarctica

== Maps ==
- L.L. Ivanov. Antarctica: Livingston Island and Greenwich, Robert, Snow and Smith Islands. Scale 1:120000 topographic map. Troyan: Manfred Wörner Foundation, 2009. ISBN 978-954-92032-6-4
