= Cora (ship) =

Several ships have been named Cora:

- Cora (1812 ship) was launched in 1812 and came to England from New Providence. She sailed to Britain and between 1813 and 1820 she was a West Indiaman. Then in 1820 she sailed to the New South Shetland Islands to engage in seal hunting. She was wrecked there in 1821.
- Cora (1812 Baltimore ship) was a schooner launched at Baltimore in 1812. The Royal Navy captured her in February 1813.

== Notes ==
- The two vessels above may be the same vessel. It will require original research to settle the question.

== See also ==
- Cora-cora
