= Lynx Rocks =

Rocks in the South Shetland Islands, Antarctica

- Location of Livingston Island in the South Shetland Islands

- Location on Antarctic Peninsula Location in Antarctica

Geography
- Location: Antarctica
- Coordinates: 62°32′22.1″S 60°32′59.2″W
- Archipelago: South Shetland Islands

Administration
- Antarctica
- Administered under the Antarctic Treaty System

Demographics
- Population: uninhabited

Lynx Rocks is a group of rocks in southwestern Hero Bay on the north side of Livingston Island in the South Shetland Islands, Antarctica. The area was visited by early 19th century sealers operating from nearby Blythe Bay.

The feature is named after the Australian sealing vessel Lynx under Captain Richard Siddins that visited the South Shetland in 1820-21 and 1821–22, wintering in the Falkland Islands in 1821.

== Location ==
The rocks are centred at 62°32′22.1″S 60°32′59.2″W which is 5.95 km (3.70 mi) west of Siddins Point, 3.97 km (2.47 mi) north-northeast of Kuklen Point, 6.63 km (4.12 mi) east of Agüero Point, 10.41 km (6.47 mi) southeast of Black Point and 6.03 km (3.75 mi) southwest of Chapman Rocks (British mapping in 1968, Chilean in 1971, Argentine in 1980, and Bulgarian in 2009).

Topographic map of Livingston Island, Greenwich, Robert, Snow and Smith Islands

== See also ==
- Composite Antarctic Gazetteer
- List of Antarctic islands south of 60° S
- SCAR
- Territorial claims in Antarctica

== Maps ==
- L.L. Ivanov. Antarctica: Livingston Island and Greenwich, Robert, Snow and Smith Islands. Scale 1:120000 topographic map. Troyan: Manfred Wörner Foundation, 2009. ISBN 978-954-92032-6-4
