= Neck or Nothing Passage =

Narrow passage in the South Shetland Islands

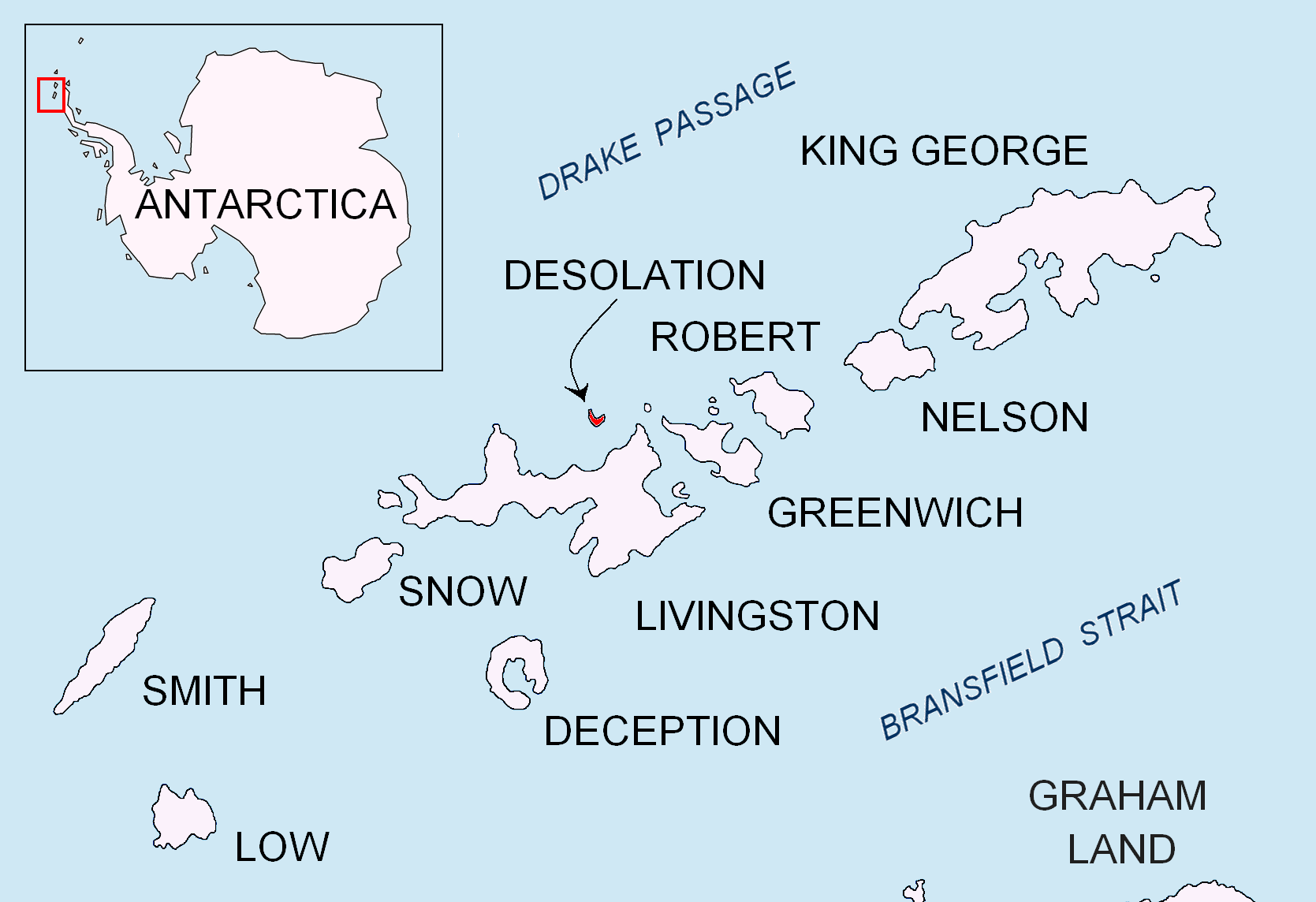
Location of Desolation Island in the South Shetland Islands.

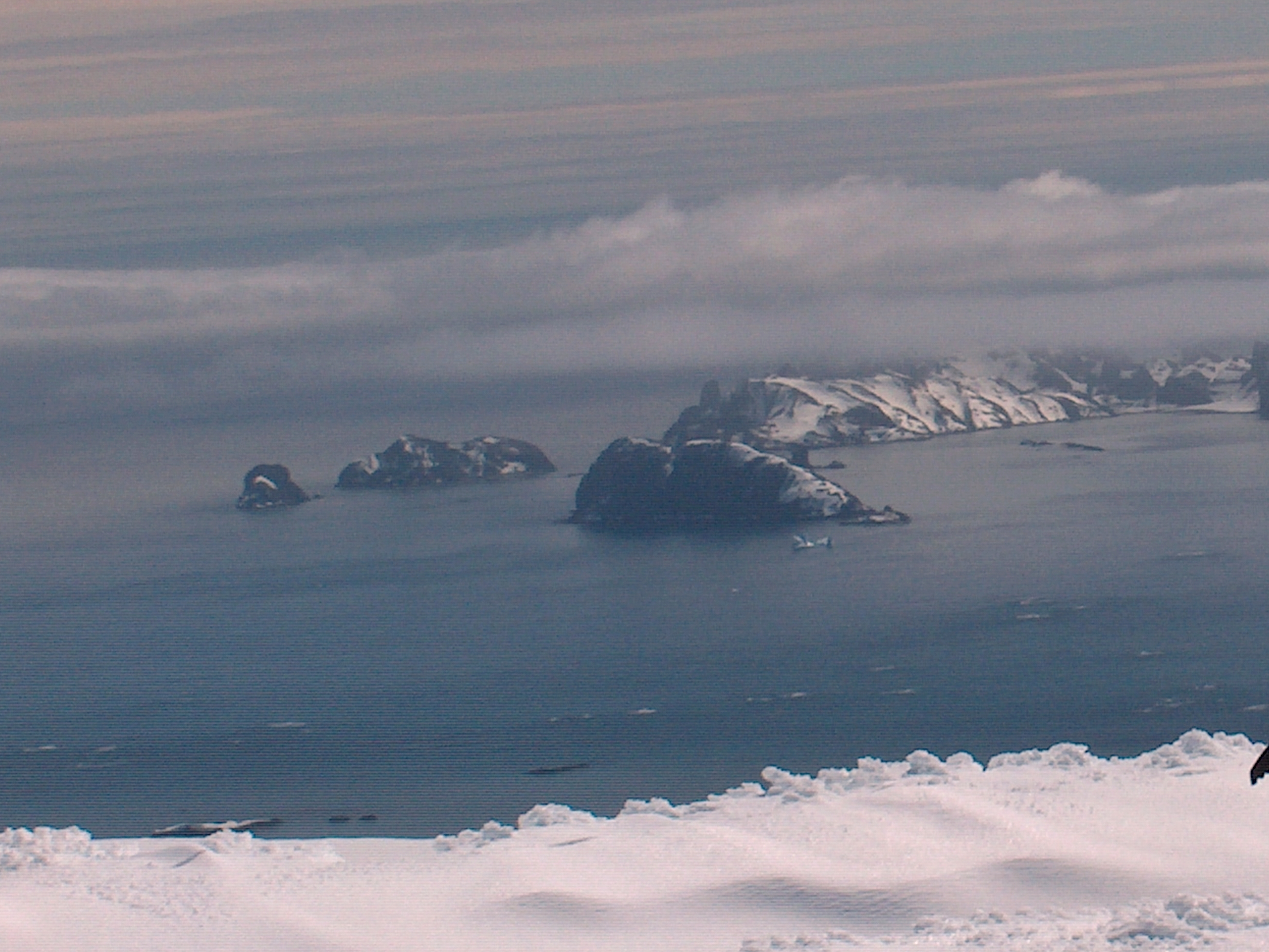
Neck or Nothing Passage between Miladinovi Islets on the left and Desolation Island behind Wood Island, from Zemen Knoll

Neck or Nothing Passage (62°28′16″S 60°20′24″W) is a narrow passage leading from Blythe Bay between Iratais Point in the south end of Desolation Island and Miladinovi Islets, in the South Shetland Islands. The name was applied prior to 1830, probably by whalers who frequented Blythe Bay and who at times ran their vessels to sea via this passage to escape severe easterly gales.

== Maps ==
- L.L. Ivanov et al., Antarctica: Livingston Island and Greenwich Island, South Shetland Islands (from English Strait to Morton Strait, with illustrations and ice-cover distribution), 1:100000 scale topographic map, Antarctic Place-names Commission of Bulgaria, Sofia, 2005.
- L.L. Ivanov. Antarctica: Livingston Island and Greenwich, Robert, Snow and Smith Islands. Scale 1:120000 topographic map. Troyan: Manfred Wörner Foundation, 2009. ISBN 978-954-92032-6-4

Topographic map of Livingston Island, Greenwich, Robert, Snow and Smith Islands.
