= Ștefan Iulius Gavril =

Romanian Distance Runner

Stefan Iulius Gavril
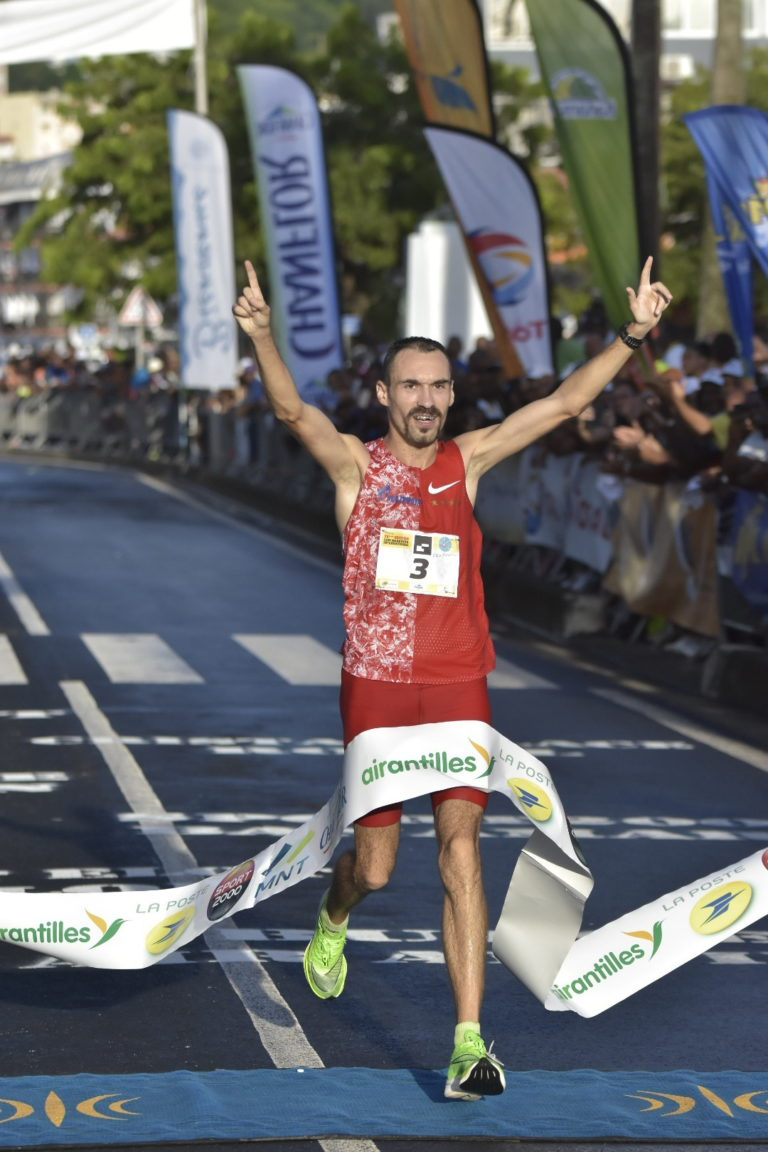
- Gavril Action 2019

Personal information
- Born: 17 July 1989 (age 37) Brasov, Romania

Sport
- Country: Romania
- Sport: Track and field
- Events: 10 km, Half marathon
- Team: Nice Côte d'Azur Athlétisme

Achievements and titles
- Personal bests: 5 km: 14:07 (Monaco 2020); 10 km: 28:53 (Dakhla 2019)

Ștefan Iulius Gavril (born 17 July 1989 in Brașov) is a Romanian distance runner who competes over distances from 800 metres to the half marathon.

Gavril was a Romanian national record holder in two events: the 5K run and 10K run road race.

He is an athlete of Nice Côte d'Azur Athletisme.

== Biography ==
In 2003, Gavril moved with his family to Italy, where he began practising kickboxing and martial arts. In 2011, he won the BestFighter World Cup in kickboxing. He became interested in running and took part in his first race in Turin in 2013. After six months, he moved to Umeå and began training there. He studied political science and international relations at Umeå University and was a member of IFK Umeå from 2013 to 2014.

He later competed for Nice Côte d'Azur Athlétisme. In 2019, he set a Romanian record in the 10 km road race with a time of 28:53; Dorin Andrei Rusu broke the record in 2022. In 2020, Gavril set the Romanian 5 km road record at 14:06.

Gavril represented Romania at the 2020 Balkan Half Marathon Championships in Zagreb, finishing fourth with a personal best. He placed third at the 2023 Balkan Half Marathon Championships in Bitola. At the 2022 European Cross Country Championships in Turin, he finished 65th. He later placed ninth at the 2024 Balkan Cross Country Championships in Câmpulung Moldovenesc, fourth at the 2025 Balkan Half Marathon Championships in Athens, and 14th at the 2026 Balkan Cross Country Championships in Koynare.

Among his road-racing wins are the 2019 Fort-de-France Half Marathon and the 2020 Portofino Run. In 2025, he finished 11th at the Pyongyang International Marathon in 2:19:50, then placed second at the Neapolis Marathon in Naples. He lives in Italy and is registered in Romania with CSM Cluj and CSU Cluj.

== Personal bests ==
- 1000 metres – 2:30.14 (Monaco 2019)
- 1500 metres – 3:52.09 (Pitești 2017)
  - 1500 metres indoor – 3:59.96 (Bucharest 2019)
- 3000 metres – 8:17.39 (Milan 2018)
  - 3000 metres indoor – 8:16.49 (Valencia 2020)
- 5000 metres – 14:05.88 (Milan 2021)
- 10,000 metres – 29:33.44 (London 2019)

Road

- 5 kilometres – 14:06 (Monaco 2020)
- 10 kilometres – 28:53 (Dakhla 2019)
- Half marathon – 1:04:17 (Ústí nad Labem 2022)
- Marathon – 2:19:50 (Pyongyang 2025)

== International competitions ==
Representing Romania
Year	Competition	Venue	Position	Event	Result
2017	Balkan Championships	Novi Pazar, Serbia	6th	1500 m	3:56.93
2017	Balkan Championships	Novi Pazar, Serbia	4th	3000 m	8:34.15
2018	Balkan Cross Country Championships	Botoșani, Romania	5th	XC 10 km	30:12
2018	Balkan Cross Country Championships	Botoșani, Romania	2nd	Team	
2019	European 10,000m Cup	London, United Kingdom	2nd	10,000 m	29:33.44
2020	Balkan Half Marathon Championships	Zagreb, Croatia	4th	Half marathon	1:07:11
2021	Balkan Half Marathon Championships	Bitola, North Macedonia	6th	Half marathon	1:07:47
2022	European Cross Country Championships	Turin, Italy	65th	XC 9.572 km	32:42
2023	Balkan Half Marathon Championships	Bitola, North Macedonia	3rd	Half marathon	1:07:42
2023	JTBC Seoul Marathon	Seoul, South Korea	11th	Marathon	2:27:12
2023	Mattoni Ústí nad Labem Half Marathon	Ústí nad Labem, Czech Republic	4th	Half marathon	1:07:06
2023	tRUNsylvania International 10K	Brașov, Romania	12th	10 km	30:29
2023	Romanian Senior and U20 Cup	Craiova, Romania	2nd	5000 m	15:13.92
2023	Meeting National à thème de l'Est Lyonnais	Décines-Charpieu, France		5000 m	DNF
2023	Mattoni Half Marathon Olomouc	Olomouc, Czech Republic	8th	Half marathon	1:07:35
2023	Mattoni Half Marathon České Budějovice	České Budějovice, Czech Republic	5th	Half marathon	1:06:47
2023	Mattoni Half Marathon Karlovy Vary	Karlovy Vary, Czech Republic	4th	Half marathon	1:07:40
2023	10 km de Saint-Médard-en-Jalles	Saint-Médard-en-Jalles, France	6th	10 km	29:48
2023	Monaco Run	Monaco	13th	5 km	14:18
2023	Auvergne-Rhône-Alpes Regional Championships	Lyon, France	3rd	3000 m indoor	8:27.06
2024	Balkan Cross Country Championships	Câmpulung Moldovenesc, Romania	9th	XC 10 km	32:03
2024	Mattoni Napoli City Half Marathon	Naples, Italy	15th	Half marathon	1:08:05
2024	Mattoni Half Marathon Karlovy Vary	Karlovy Vary, Czech Republic	11th	Half marathon	1:08:20
2024	Meeting National de l'Est Lyonnais	Décines-Charpieu, France	16th	5000 m	14:43.48
2024	Mattoni Half Marathon Olomouc	Olomouc, Czech Republic	7th	Half marathon	1:07:02
2024	Mattoni Half Marathon České Budějovice	České Budějovice, Czech Republic	11th	Half marathon	1:07:48
2024	Giro Podistico Internazionale di Castelbuono	Castelbuono, Italy	13th	Road race	38:01
2024	Mattoni Ústí nad Labem Half Marathon	Ústí nad Labem, Czech Republic	4th	Half marathon	1:07:55
2025	Semi Marathon International de Tamesna	Tamesna, Morocco	20th	Half marathon	1:07:21
2025	Pyongyang International Marathon	Pyongyang, North Korea	11th	Marathon	2:19:50
2025	Balkan Half Marathon Championships	Athens, Greece	4th	Half marathon	1:07:08
2025	Mattoni Half Marathon Karlovy Vary	Karlovy Vary, Czech Republic	6th	Half marathon	1:07:31
2025	Mattoni Half Marathon České Budějovice	České Budějovice, Czech Republic	6th	Half marathon	1:07:44
2025	Mattoni Half Marathon Olomouc	Olomouc, Czech Republic	9th	Half marathon	1:08:03
2025	Romanian Senior Cup	Bucharest, Romania	1st	5000 m	15:12.75
2025	Mattoni Ústí nad Labem Half Marathon	Ústí nad Labem, Czech Republic	6th	Half marathon	1:07:58
2025	Balkan Cross Country Championships	Băile Felix, Romania	14th	XC 10 km	34:23
2025	Neapolis Marathon	Naples, Italy	2nd	Marathon	2:26:14
2026	Balkan Cross Country Championships	Koynare, Bulgaria	14th	XC 10 km	36:00
2026	Neapolis Marathon	Naples, Italy	4th	Marathon	2:28:25
