= Indian (1814 ship) =

History

United States
- Builder: Massachusetts
- Launched: 1805, or 1808
- Captured: c.1814

United Kingdom
- Name: Indian
- Acquired: 1814 by purchase of a prize
- Fate: Abandoned 17 August 1827

General characteristics
- Tons burthen: 247 (bm)
- Armament: 10 × 9-pounder carronades

Indian was launched in Massachusetts in 1805, possibly under the same name. She first appeared in British records in 1814, suggesting that she was a prize. She was Liverpool-based and traded widely, especially with South America. She was in Valparaiso in 1820, when news of the discovery of the South Shetland Islands and the sealing grounds there reached Valparaiso before it reached England. She sailed to the South Shetland Islands and gathered over 25,000 seal skins before returning to Liverpool. Thereafter, she returned to trading across the Atlantic. Her crew abandoned her in a waterlogged state on 17 August 1827.

== Career ==
Indian first appeared in Lloyd's Register (LR) in 1814, with A.Hannay, master, S.Holland, owner. and trade Liverpool-Cadiz. It also gave her origin simply as "America" and her launch year as 1808. The Register of Shipping (RS) for 1814 agreed with LR on master and owner. However, it gave her trade as Liverpool–Havana, her origin as Massachusetts, and her launch year as 1805.

Year	Master	Owner	Trade	Source
1816	J.Potts; Balberny	S.Holland; Kenworthy	Liverpool–Cuba	LR
1819	R.Page; J.King	Kenworthy	Liverpool–Brazils	LR
1820	J.King; F.Spiller	Kenworthy	Liverpool–Africa; Liverpool–South Seas	LR

In 1819, Captain Ferdinand Spiller (or Sheller), sailed for the coast of Chile and Peru.

In June 1820, Indian sailed from Valparaiso for the newly discovered South Shetland Islands and their sealing grounds. (Note: In October 1819 William, William Smith, master, had fortuitously discovered the islands while on a voyage from Buenos Aires to Valparaiso. On reaching Valparaiso Smith reported his discovery of the islands and the abundance of seals there, to Captain Shirref of HMS Andromache.) Indian arrived back at Plymouth on 27 May 1821, having left the New South Shetlands on 13 March, and Pernambuco on 21 April. She arrived in London on 29 May with 26,725 seal skins. She brought with her Robert Fildes and some of his crew from Cora, which had wrecked at Desolation Island, as well as eight men from another damaged sealer.

On 28 January 1822, Indian, Speller, master, arrived at Lisbon from Liverpool for Pernambuco. On 26 June, she arrived back at Liverpool, having left Pernambuco on 21 April.

Year	Master	Owner	Trade	Source
1822	Spiller	Kenworthy	Liverpool–Brazils	LR; small repairs 1821
1827	Spiller; Barclay	Kenworthy	Liverpool–Brazils	LR; small repairs 1823

== Fate ==
On 17 August 1827, Captain Berkley and his crew abandoned Indian at sea. She had 6 ft 9 in (2.1 m) of water in her hold. The crew took to her longboat and reached Liverpool, Nova Scotia a few days later. Lloyd's List reported on 5 October, that Indian had been wrecked at 43°N 64°W while on her way from Saint John, New Brunswick, to Belfast. On 19 October, Lloyd's List reported that Mayflower had seen an abandoned vessel at 43°N 65°W that was believed to have been Indian.
