= Cape Danger =

Rocky point in the South Shetland Islands, Antarctica

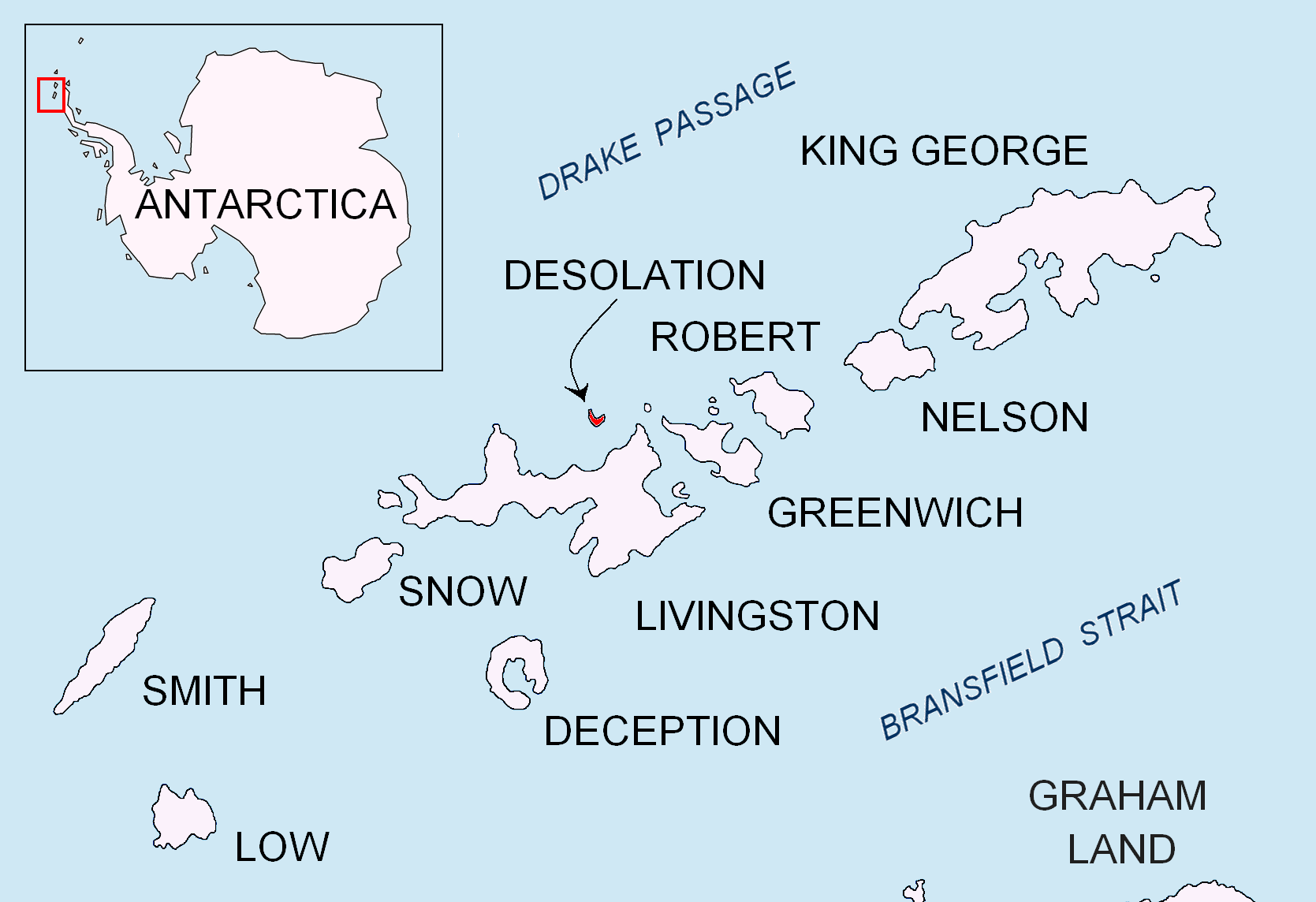
Location of Desolation Island in the South Shetland Islands

Topographic map of Livingston Island

Cape Danger is the rocky point forming the northwest extremity of the ice-free Desolation Island situated in the entrance to Hero Bay, Livingston Island in the South Shetland Islands, Antarctica. The cape forms the west side of the entrance to Kozma Cove. The area was visited by early 19th century sealers operating from nearby Blythe Bay.

The feature was charted in 1935 by Discovery Investigations personnel and so named because of a group of sunken rocks extending from the cape.

== Location ==
The cape is located at 62°26′38.5″S 60°22′15.3″W which is 12.13 km west of Williams Point, 3.33 km north-northwest of Iratais Point, 11.68 km north-northeast of Siddins Point and 21.6 km east of Cape Shirreff (British mapping in 1935, 1942, 1948 and 1968, Argentine in 1948, 1953 and 1954, Chilean in 1971, and Bulgarian in 2005 and 2009).

== Maps ==
- L.L. Ivanov et al. Antarctica: Livingston Island and Greenwich Island, South Shetland Islands. Scale 1:100000 topographic map. Sofia: Antarctic Place-names Commission of Bulgaria, 2005.
- L.L. Ivanov. Antarctica: Livingston Island and Greenwich, Robert, Snow and Smith Islands. Scale 1:120000 topographic map. Troyan: Manfred Wörner Foundation, 2009. ISBN 978-954-92032-6-4
- L.L. Ivanov. Antarctica: Livingston Island and Smith Island. Scale 1:100000 topographic map. Manfred Wörner Foundation, 2017. ISBN 978-619-90008-3-0
