= Robert (1814 ship) =

History

United Kingdom
- Name: Robert
- Owner: H. Wood
- Builder: United States
- Acquired: 1814 by purchase of a prize
- Fate: Wrecked 1822

General characteristics
- Tons burthen: 158, or 164 (bm)
- Sail plan: Brig

Robert entered Lloyd's Register in 1815 as an American prize. Until 1822 the brig was a West Indiaman based in Liverpool and sailing to the Bahamas or Havana. On 2 February 1817 Lloyd's List reported that Robert, Wilkes, master, had been sailing from New Providence to Liverpool when she struck a reef off Egg Island and had to put back for repairs.

In 1822 she was under the command of Captain R. Fields, or R. Fyldes, or Fieldes, or Robert Fildes. He sailed her to go seal hunting in the South Shetland Islands, where she was lost on 7 March 1822.

Robert anchored in Clothier Harbour for most of the season. There ice damaged her. Several other whaling captains surveyed her and declared her a total loss. Her crew were saved.

== Robert Fildes ==
Robert Fyldes had visited Desolation Island and the South Shetlands in 1820–1821 as captain of Cora, owned by his father-in-law Henry Wood. Fildes in 1821 introduced the name Livingston Island for the second largest island in the South Shetlands, popular until then as 'Friesland Island' and also known as 'Smolensk Island'.

Fildes may have named Robert Island for Robert.

Fildes Strait, between King George Island and Nelson Island, in the South Shetland Islands, is named for Robert Fildes.

Year	Master	Owner	Trade	Source
1815	H.Wilkes	Wood & Co.	London–Bahamas	Lloyd's Register
1816	H.Wilson	Wood & Co.	Liverpool–Bahamas	Register of Shipping
1818	Wilkes	Wood & Co.	Liverpool–Havana	Register of Shipping
1820	M.Sands	Wood & Co.	Liverpool–Bahamas	Register of Shipping
1822	R. Fields	Wood & Co.	Liverpool–Southern Fishery	Lloyd's Register
1822	R.Fyldes	H.Wood	Liverpool–Southern Fishery	Register of Shipping
