= Boynik =

Boynik Бойник
- Village
- Location within Bulgaria
- Coordinates: 41.6000°N 25.6833°E
- Country: Bulgaria
- Province: Kardzhali Province
- Municipality: Krumovgrad
- Time zone: UTC+2 (EET)
  - Summer (DST): UTC+3 (EEST)

Boynik is a village in Krumovgrad Municipality, Kardzhali Province, southern Bulgaria. Every year, the village hosts a "Fellow Countryman Gathering," a tradition that has been celebrated for 32 years.

Boynik Point in Antarctica is named after the village.

== Landmarks ==
Roughly 2 km northwest of Boynik village, on a rocky slope north of the peak known as Pandak Khaya, lies the Thracian fortress. The site is only accessible from the south due to steep cliffs on the other sides. The fortress wall, preserved under a 4.5-meter embankment, is estimated to be 2.5 to 3 meters wide, with a tower situated in the middle.

Not far from the fortress, the Valchi Dol reserve is another notable attraction. This reserve features 15 plant species listed in the Red Book of Bulgaria and hosts 23 raptor species, including 21 that are also listed in the Red Book. Endangered birds like the Imperial Eagle and the Black Vulture are found here, according to BirdLife International. The reserve is also home to a variety of reptiles and mammals, such as hinds, wild boars, and wolves.
