= Fildes Strait =

Strait in the South Shetland Islands

Coordinates: 62°13′58″S 58°59′56″W

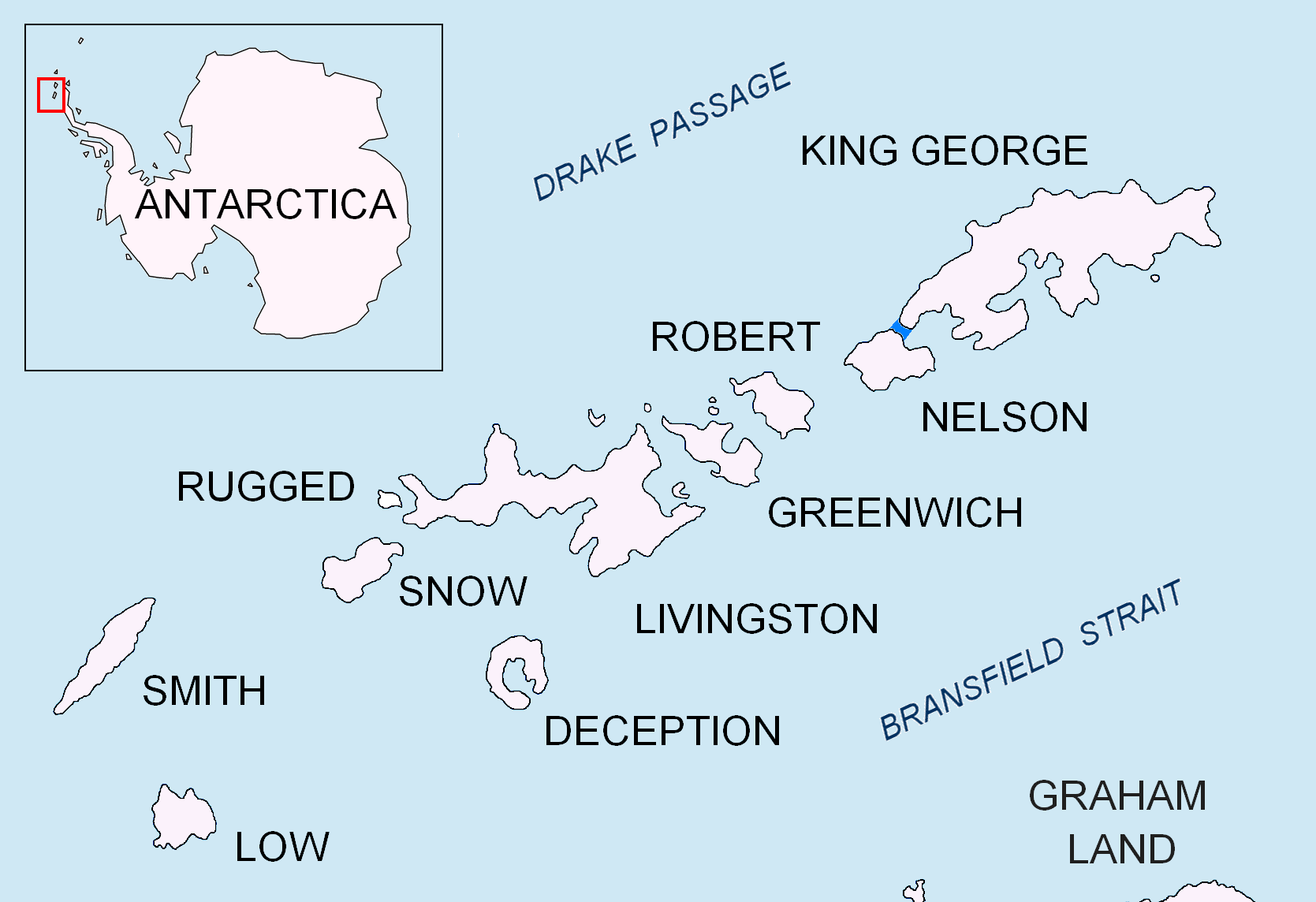
Location of Fildes Strait in the South Shetland Islands.

Fildes Strait is a strait which extends in a general east-west direction between King George Island and Nelson Island, in the South Shetland Islands. This strait has been known to sealers in the area since about 1822, but at that time it appeared on the charts as "Field's Strait". It was probably named for Robert Fildes, a British sealer of that period, whose vessel Robert was wrecked in Clothier Harbour in 1822.
