= Iratais Point =

Point in the entrance to Hero Bay, Livingston Island, Antarctica

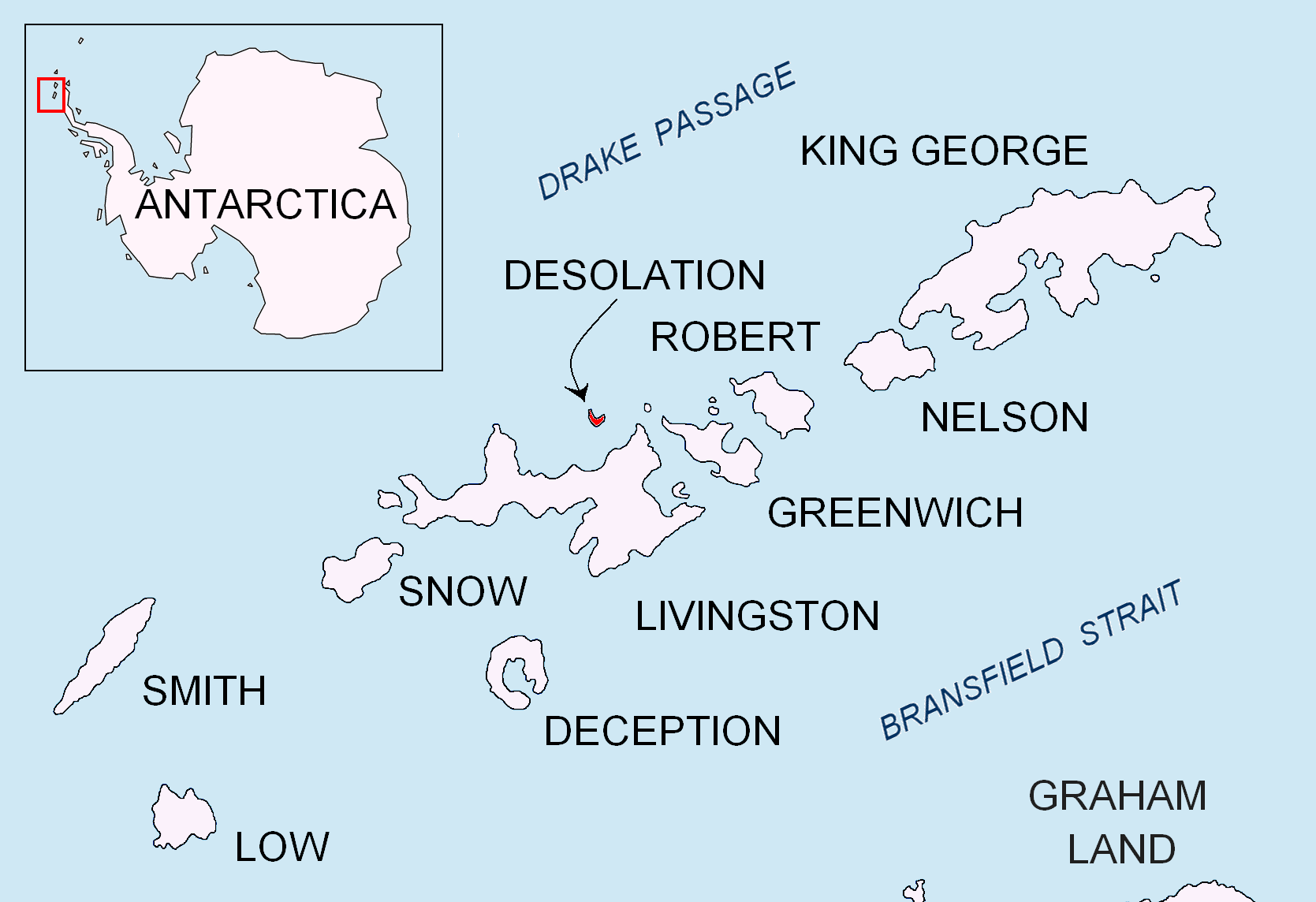
Location of Desolation Island in the South Shetland Islands.

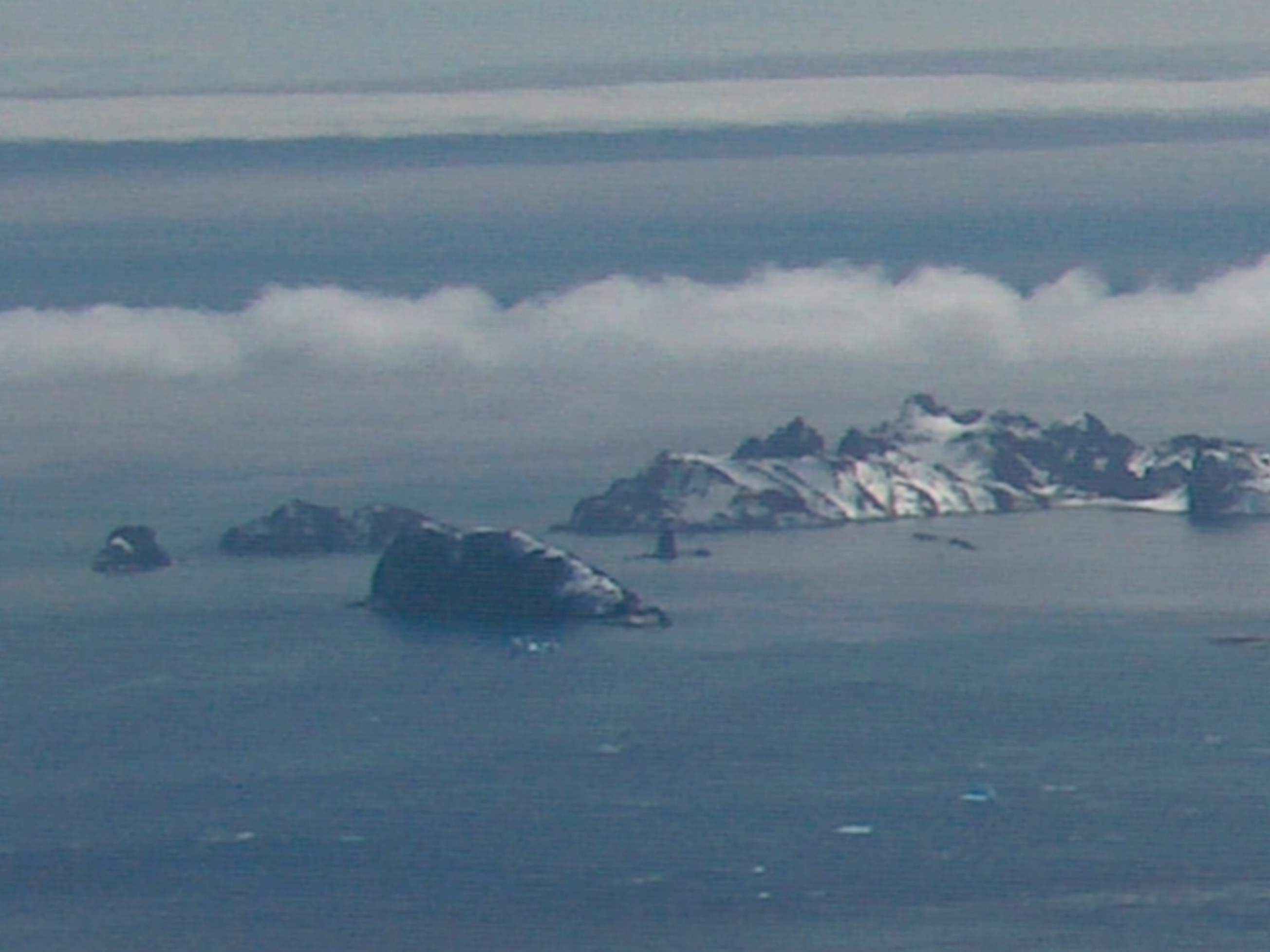
Iratais Point (behind Wood Island in the foreground) from Zemen Knoll, Livingston Island.

Topographic map of Livingston Island.

Iratais Point (Nos Iratais \'nos i-ra-'ta-is\) is a point forming both the south extremity and the vertex of the V-shaped Desolation Island situated in the entrance to Hero Bay, Livingston Island, Antarctica. Separated from Miladinovi Islets to the south by Neck or Nothing Passage.

The feature is named after Kavhan (hereditary viceroy function) Iratais, governor of the southern Bulgarian Black Sea region under Khan Krum the Horrible (9th century AD).

== Location ==
The point is located at 62°28′10″S 60°20′16″W which is 3.33 km south-southeast of Cape Danger, 10.55 km west-southwest of Williams Point, 9.75 km north-northeast of Siddins Point and 23.27 km east by south of Cape Shirreff (British mapping in 1968, and Bulgarian in 2005 and 2009).

== Maps ==
- L.L. Ivanov et al. Antarctica: Livingston Island and Greenwich Island, South Shetland Islands. Scale 1:100000 topographic map. Sofia: Antarctic Place-names Commission of Bulgaria, 2005.
- L.L. Ivanov. Antarctica: Livingston Island and Greenwich, Robert, Snow and Smith Islands. Scale 1:120000 topographic map. Troyan: Manfred Wörner Foundation, 2009. ISBN 978-954-92032-6-4
- Antarctic Digital Database (ADD). Scale 1:250000 topographic map of Antarctica. Scientific Committee on Antarctic Research (SCAR). Since 1993, regularly upgraded and updated.
- L.L. Ivanov. Antarctica: Livingston Island and Smith Island. Scale 1:100000 topographic map. Manfred Wörner Foundation, 2017. ISBN 978-619-90008-3-0
