= Cora (1812 Baltimore ship) =

History

United States
- Name: Cora
- Builder: Baltimore
- Commissioned: 16 July 1812
- Captured: 14 February 1813

General characteristics
- Tons burthen: 258 (bm)
- Length: 102 ft (31 m)
- Beam: 24 ft 5 in (7.44 m)
- Sail plan: Schooner
- Complement: 40
- Armament: 6 × 9-pounder guns + 2 × 12-pounder carronades

Cora was a schooner launched at Baltimore in 1812. Captain Joseph Gold acquired a letter of marque and Cora was commissioned on 26 July.

Cora was at Annapolis when on 21 July a large brig, not flying any colours, came to anchor in the mouth of the Severn river. The fort fired on the brig, but she was too far away for the shots to reach. Captain Gold had not yet arrived so Cora's Chief Mate, Richard P. Weathers, weighed anchor and stood toward the brig. The brig was HMS Bloodhound, Captain Charles Rubridge, which was bringing some diplomatic mail and was unaware that the United States had declared war on the United Kingdom. As a pilot brought Bloodhound into Annapolis Cora came alongside and took possession of her and brought her under the guns of Fort Madison, a battery on Beaman's Point. Bloodhound's crew were interned in the barracks there and under guard. The United States Government had Bloodhound released to take dispatches back to Plymouth as she was on a diplomatic mission. (Note: On 8 July the American privateer Dash had captured HMS Whiting, which had come into Hampton Roads with diplomatic dispatches, also unaware of the outbreak of war. The United States Government ordered Whiting's release.)

Fate: The boats of the British squadron blockading the Chesapeake captured Cora on 14 February 1813. In describing Cora, Captain George Burdett of HMS Maidstone described Cora as being on her first voyage and the fastest vessel out of Baltimore. She was returning from Bordeaux with a valuable cargo of brandy, wine, silks, flints, and the like. She had fired on the boats that captured her, but she had not been able to inflict any casualties. (Note: If her captors sent Cora into New Providence, she may have become the British Southern Whale Fishery whaler Cora. (They apparently did not send her into Halifax, Nova Scotia.) It will require original research to settle the question.)
