= Koynare =

Koynare Койнаре
- Location of Koynare
- Coordinates: 43°21′26″N 24°08′40″E
- Country: Bulgaria
- Province (Oblast): Pleven

Government
  - Mayor: Danail Tonovski
- Elevation: 78 m (256 ft)

Population (December 2009)
  - Total: 4,464
- Time zone: UTC+2 (EET)
  - Summer (DST): UTC+3 (EEST)
- Postal Code: 5986
- Area code: 06573

Koynare (Bulgarian: Койнаре, also transliterated as Kojnare, pronounced [kojˈnare]) is a town in northern Bulgaria, part of Cherven Bryag Municipality, Pleven Province. It lies on the left bank of the Iskar River, at one of the river's meanders. As of December 2009, the town had a population of 4,464.

The vicinity of Koynare has been inhabited since the Neolithic time period, with remains dating to then in the Beli Breg and Borishnitsa areas. In Antiquity, that region was settled by the Thracians: there are ruins of Thracian settlements in the Progon and Novoselski Pat areas and a Thracian warrior grave in the Gruya area. During the Roman Empire, there was a Roman waystation north-northeast of the modern town, at the Oescus–Serdica and Melta–Montana crossroads. With the arrival of the Slavs in the Middle Ages, Koynare was populated by these people, who later became part of the Bulgarian ethnicity. Medieval Christian burials have been unearthed near Koynare, testifying to the existence of a settlement during the Bulgarian Empire.

However, Koynare was first mentioned in historical registers in 1516–1517, when it was already part of the Ottoman Empire. At the time, the town, listed as Koynar, was part of the Nikopol (Niğbolu) district. In his 1882 study Donau-Bulgarien und der Balkan, Austro–Hungarian geographer Felix Philipp Kanitz mentions Koynare as a village inhabited by 310 Bulgarian Orthodox, 130 Muslim Bulgarian (Pomak) and 70 Romani families. Afterwards many Muslims established new villages in Ipsala, Eastern Thrace in villages such as Kojnare (Aličo Pehlivan), Koca Hıdır etc. still speaking their slavic language. With the Liberation of Bulgaria in 1878, Koynare became part of the modern Bulgarian state. In 1964, it was proclaimed an urban-type settlement and 10 years later, in 1974, it acquired town privileges.

Today, the bulk of the population is Bulgarian Orthodox, belonging to the Byala Slatina district of the Eparchy of Vratsa. The town has an Orthodox church called the All Saints Church. In the past, the town had a Muslim Bulgarian population, which in 1893 numbered 446. Some of the Roma people are Protestant. There are two schools and a kindergarten in Koynare. The economy is traditionally based on agriculture and stock breeding: Koynare was a major producer of sheep cheese (sirene) until 1944. The town has a small hydroelectrical power plant and two tailoring companies who produce clothing for export.

Koynare Rocks in Hero Bay in Livingston Island, Antarctica is named after Koynare.
