= Craggy Island (Tasmania) =

Island in Bass Strait, Australia

- Location within Tasmania

Geography
- Location: Bass Strait
- Coordinates: 39°41′14″S 147°40′41″E
- Archipelago: Bass Pyramid Group
- Area: 39 ha (96 acres)

Administration
- Australia
- State: Tasmania

Craggy Island is a rugged granite island, with an area of 38.88 ha, in south-eastern Australia. It is part of Tasmania’s Bass Pyramid Group lying in northern Bass Strait between Flinders Island and the Kent Group.

== History ==
Robinson reports there was a sealing camp on the island in 1831.

== Fauna ==
Recorded breeding seabird and wader species include little penguin, short-tailed shearwater, fairy prion, common diving-petrel, Pacific gull and sooty oystercatcher. The metallic skink is present.

== See also ==
- List of islands of Tasmania
