= Cora (1812 ship) =

History

United Kingdom
- Name: Cora
- Owner: Henry Wood
- Builder: New Providence (Note: Cora may have been the Baltimore schooner Cora that the Royal Navy captured in February 1813. If her captors had sent the Baltimore Cora into New Providence, she may have become the Cora of the present article. (They apparently did not send her into Halifax, Nova Scotia.) It will require original research to settle the question.)
- Launched: 1812
- Fate: Wrecked 1821

General characteristics
- Tons burthen: 276 (bm)
- Sail plan: Brig
- Armament: 10 × 9-pounder guns

Cora was launched in 1812 and came to England from New Providence. She sailed to Britain and between 1813 and 1820 she was a West Indiaman. Then in 1820 she sailed to the New South Shetland Islands to engage in seal hunting. She was wrecked there in 1821.

== Career ==
Cora entered Lloyd's Register in 1813 with J. Kitchen, master, H. Wood, owner, and trade Liverpool–New Providence. She had damages repaired in 1814. On 27 January 1815 Cora, Kitchen, master, sailed from Nassau, Bahamas, in a convoy under escort by HMS Childers. Cora returned to the West Indies and then sailed from New Providence on 26 September, arriving at Liverpool in late November.

In 1817 Cora sailed to The Brazils, before returning to the Liverpool–New Providence trade. Lloyd's Register for 1820 showed Fildes replacing Kitchen as master, and Cora's trade changing from Liverpool–New Providence to Liverpool–South Seas. Robert Fildes (or Fyldes), was Henry Wood's son-in-law. He sailed to the South Shetlands, and Desolation Island.

== Fate ==
Cora was lost at Desolation Island on 6 January 1821. The cove where Cora was lost was later named Cora Cove. Fildes lived in a hut made from Cora's wreckage and spent his time while awaiting rescue by preparing several charts and sailing directions for the islands. In particular, Fildes in 1821 introduced the name Livingston Island for the second largest island in the South Shetlands, known then as 'Friesland Island' or 'Smolensk Island'. Indian, Captain Spiller, master, brought Fildes and some of his crew back to England, as well as eight men from another damaged sealer.

Fildes returned to the South Shetland Islands later in 1821 in Robert, also owned by his father-in-law. Robert was lost in the Islands in early 1822.
