= Kozma Cove =

Cove in the entrance to Hero Bay, Livingston Island, Antarctica

Coordinates: 62°27′10″S 60°20′15″W

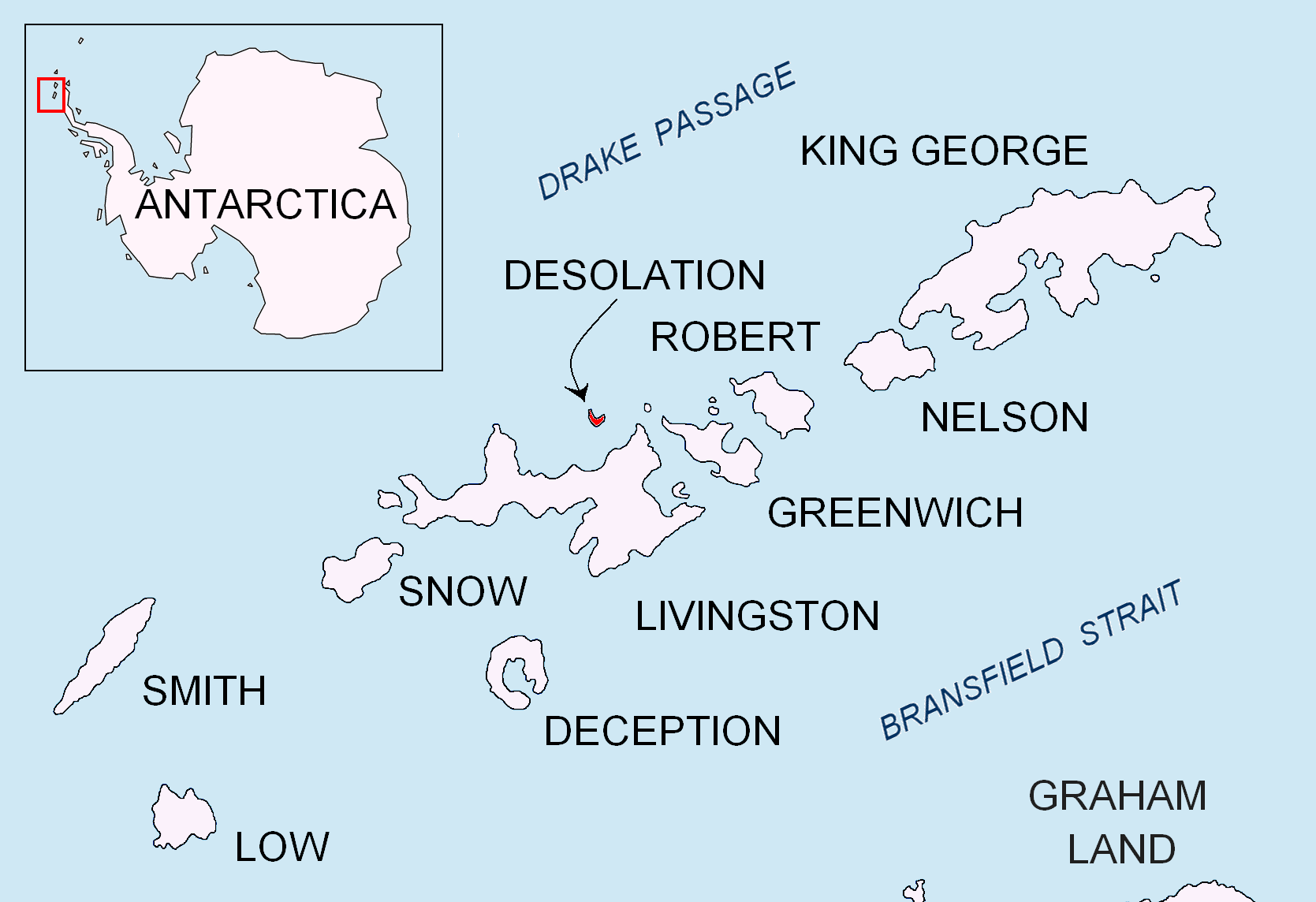
Location of Desolation Island in the South Shetland Islands.

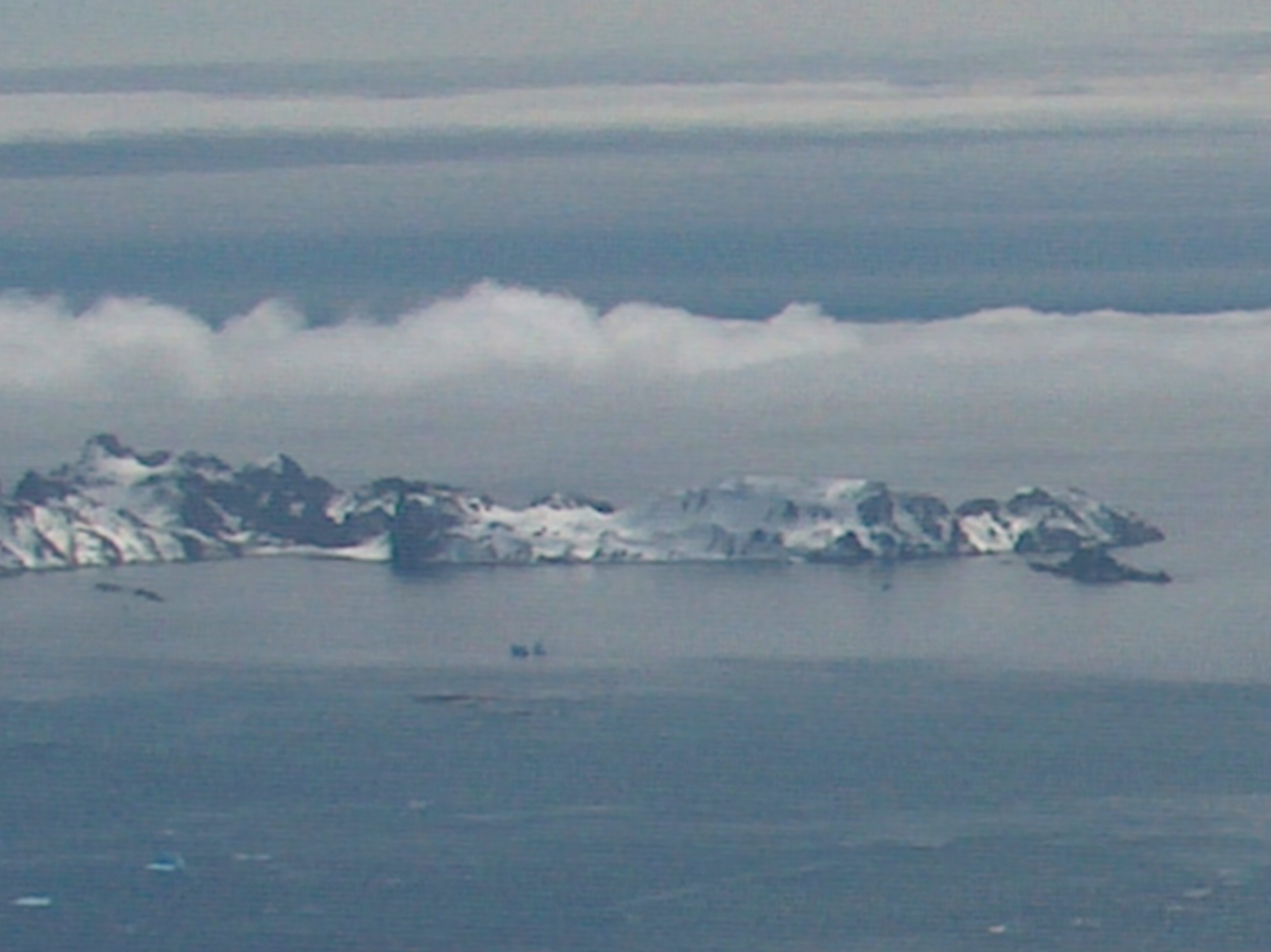
Kozma Cove (on the far side of Desolation Island).

Topographic map of Livingston Island, Greenwich, Robert, Snow and Smith Islands.

Kozma Cove (Zaliv Kozma \'za-liv koz-'ma\) is a 1.8 km wide cove indenting for 1.2 km the north coast of Desolation Island between the two arms of that V-shaped island situated in the entrance to Hero Bay, Livingston Island, Antarctica. The area was frequented by early nineteenth century English and American sealers operating from nearby Blythe Bay. British mapping in 1968, Spanish in 1991 and Bulgarian in 2005 and 2009. Named after the Bulgarian scholar Presbyter Cosmas (10th century AD).

== Maps ==
- L.L. Ivanov et al. Antarctica: Livingston Island and Greenwich Island, South Shetland Islands. Scale 1:100000 topographic map. Sofia: Antarctic Place-names Commission of Bulgaria, 2005.
- L.L. Ivanov. Antarctica: Livingston Island and Greenwich, Robert, Snow and Smith Islands. Scale 1:120000 topographic map. Troyan: Manfred Wörner Foundation, 2009. ISBN 978-954-92032-6-4
