= Miladinovi Islets =

Islands in Antarctica

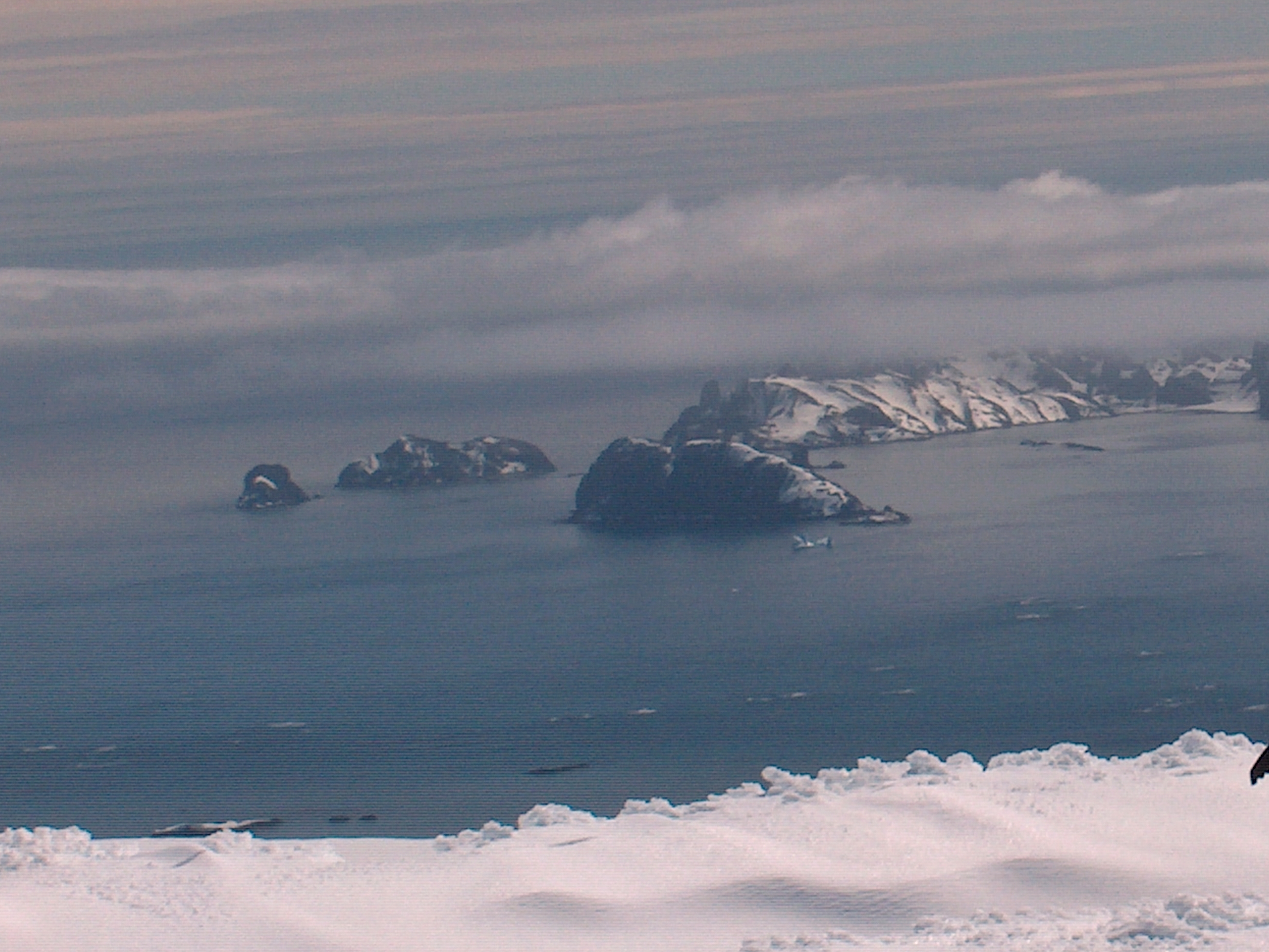
- Miladinovi Islets (on the left) from Zemen Knoll

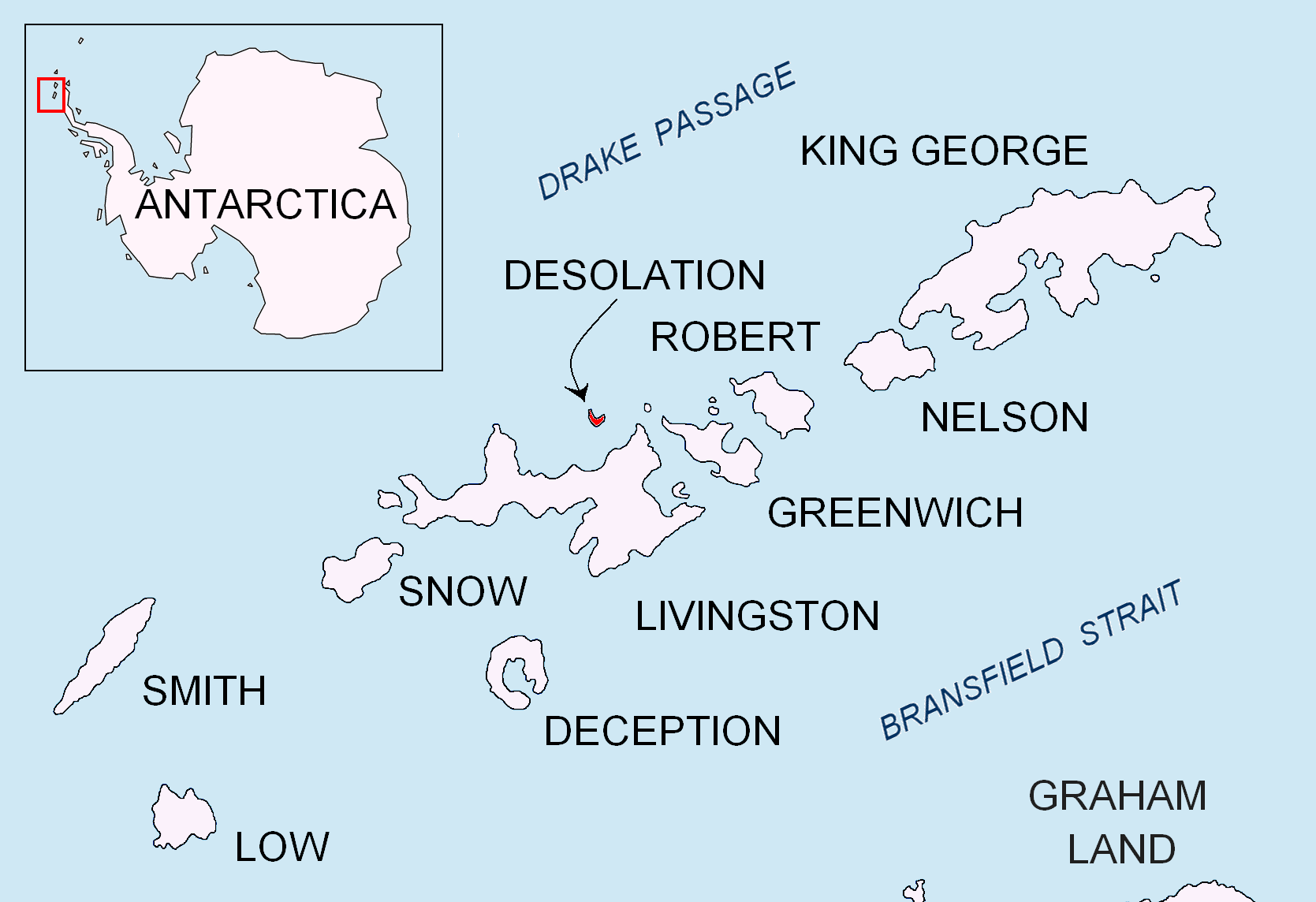

- Location of Miladinovi Islets Miladinovi Islets (Antarctic Peninsula)

Geography
- Location: Antarctica
- Coordinates: 62°28′26″S 60°20′28″W
- Archipelago: South Shetland Islands
- Area: 11 ha (27 acres)

Administration
- Administered under the Antarctic Treaty System

Demographics
- Population: Uninhabited

Miladinovi Islets (Miladinovi Ostrovi \mi-la-'di-no-vi 'o-stro-vi\) is a group of two small rocky islands, 500 by 370 m (550 by 400 yd) (surface area 11 hectares (27 acres)), and 350 by 200 m (380 by 220 yd) respectively, situated 300 m (330 yd) south of Iratais Point on Desolation Island off the north coast of Livingston Island, Antarctica. The islands are separated from Desolation Island by Neck or Nothing Passage. The area was frequented by early nineteenth century English and American sealers operating from the adjacent Blythe Bay.

Named after the Bulgarian poets and folklorists Dimitar Miladinov (1810–62) and Konstantin Miladinov (1830–62), popular as ‘Miladinovi Brothers’.

== See also ==
- Composite Antarctic Gazetteer
- List of Antarctic islands south of 60° S
- SCAR
- Territorial claims in Antarctica

== Maps ==
- L.L. Ivanov et al., Antarctica: Livingston Island and Greenwich Island, South Shetland Islands (from English Strait to Morton Strait, with illustrations and ice-cover distribution), Scale 1:100000 map, Antarctic Place-names Commission of Bulgaria, Ministry of Foreign Affairs, Sofia, 2005
- L.L. Ivanov. Antarctica: Livingston Island and Smith Island. Scale 1:100000 topographic map. Manfred Wörner Foundation, 2017. ISBN 978-619-90008-3-0
