= Bezmer Point =

Location of Varna Peninsula on Livingston Island in the South Shetland Islands.

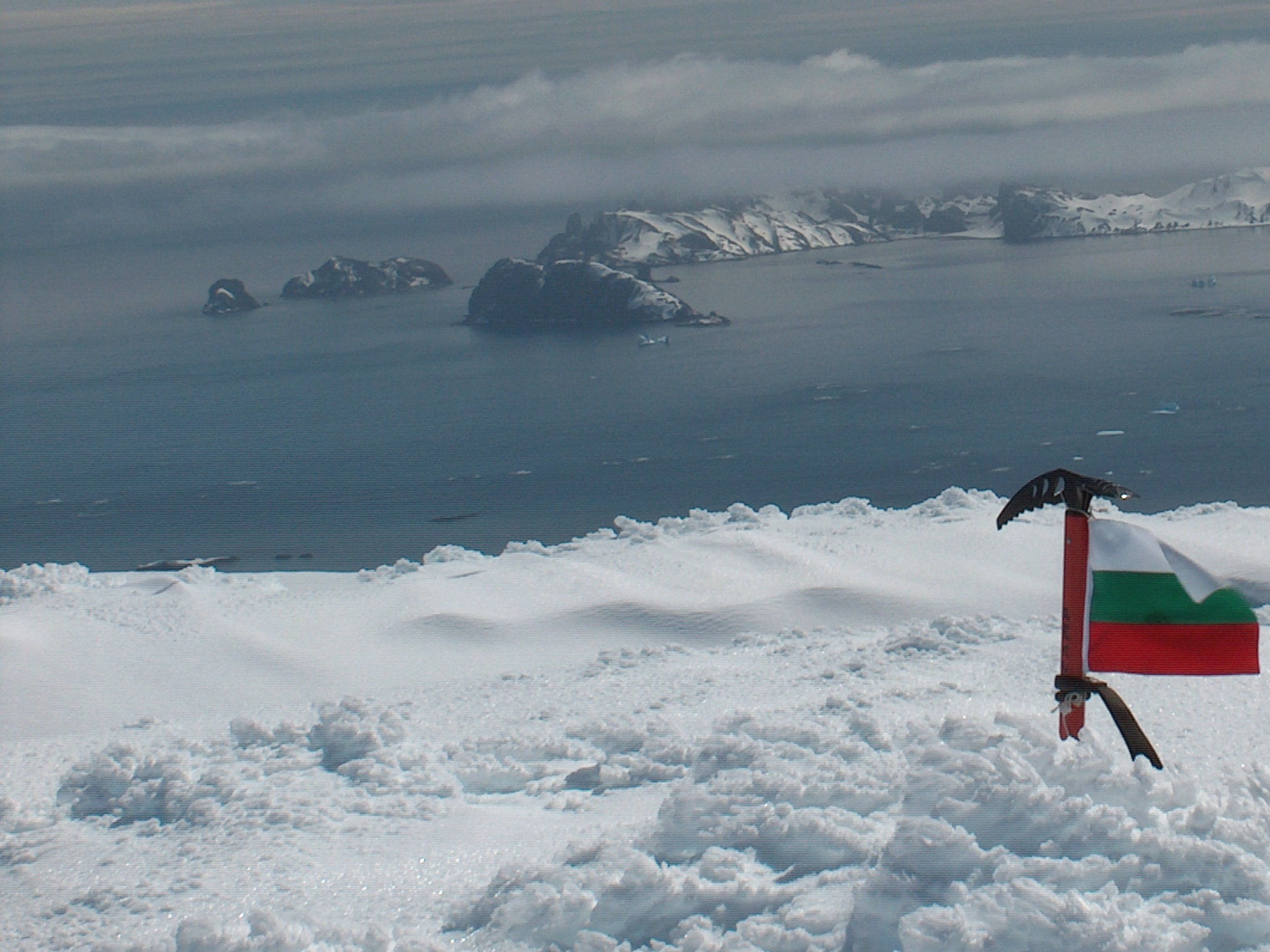
Bezmer Point from Zemen Knoll.

Topographic map of Livingston Island, Greenwich, Robert, Snow and Smith Islands.

Bezmer Point (Nos Bezmer \'nos bez-'mer\) is on the northwest coast of the Varna Peninsula on Livingston Island in the South Shetland Islands, Antarctica. The point is situated 9.6 km east-northeast of Siddins Point and 3 km southwest of Kotis Point and 4.9 km west-southwest of Miziya Peak. The feature was named after the settlement of Bezmer in Southeastern Bulgaria, in association with the Bulgarian ruler Khan Bezmer (7th Century AD).L.L. Ivanov et al., Antarctica: Livingston Island and Greenwich Island, South Shetland Islands (2005)

== Location ==
The point is located at 62°31′06″S 60°15′09″W (British mapping in 1822 and 1968, Argentine in 1980, and Bulgarian in 2005 and 2009).

== Maps ==
- L.L. Ivanov et al. Antarctica: Livingston Island and Greenwich Island, South Shetland Islands. Scale 1:100000 topographic map. Sofia: Antarctic Place-names Commission of Bulgaria, 2005.
- L.L. Ivanov. Antarctica: Livingston Island and Greenwich, Robert, Snow and Smith Islands. Scale 1:120000 topographic map. Troyan: Manfred Wörner Foundation, 2009.
