= Kotis Point =

Point on Livingston Island in the South Shetland Islands, Antarctica

Location of Varna Peninsula on Livingston Island in the South Shetland Islands.

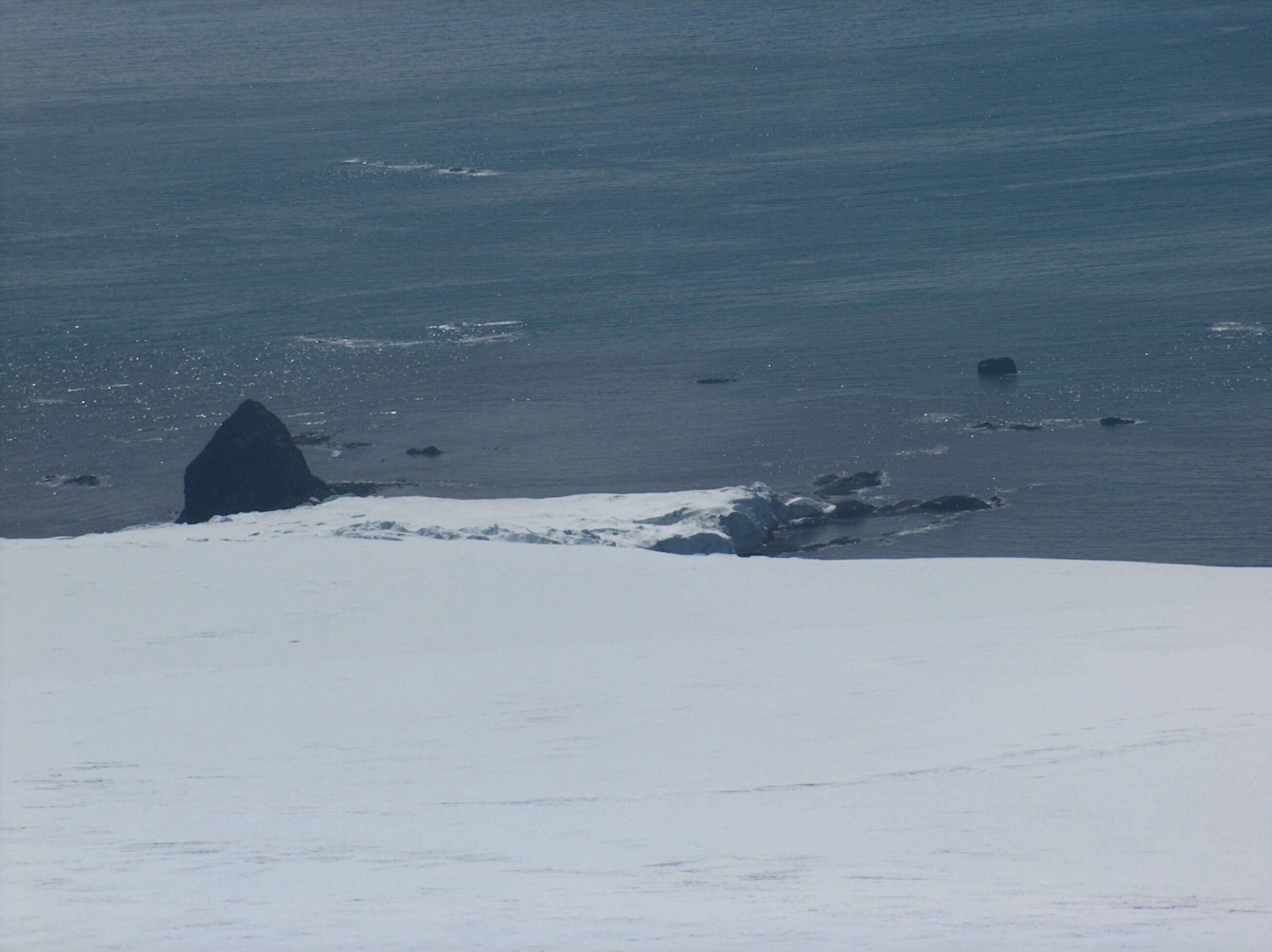
Kotis Point from Miziya Peak.

Topographic map of Livingston Island, Greenwich, Robert, Snow and Smith Islands.

Kotis Point (Nos Kotis \'nos 'ko-tis\) is a point on the northwest coast of Varna Peninsula on Livingston Island in the South Shetland Islands, Antarctica forming the south side of the entrance to Eliseyna Cove. The point is featuring a conspicuous rock at its tip, situated 3 km northeast of Bezmer Point, 6.6 km southwest of Williams Point and 12.6 km east-northeast of Siddins Point. It was named after the Thracian King Kotis I, 384-359 BC.

== Location ==
The point is located at 62°30′00″S 60°12′33″W (Bulgarian topographic survey Tangra 2004/05 and mapping in 2005 and 2009).

== Maps ==
- L.L. Ivanov et al. Antarctica: Livingston Island and Greenwich Island, South Shetland Islands. Scale 1:100000 topographic map. Sofia: Antarctic Place-names Commission of Bulgaria, 2005.
- L.L. Ivanov. Antarctica: Livingston Island and Greenwich, Robert, Snow and Smith Islands. Scale 1:120000 topographic map. Troyan: Manfred Wörner Foundation, 2009.
