= Blythe Bay =

Anchorage and bay in the South Shetland Islands, Antarctica

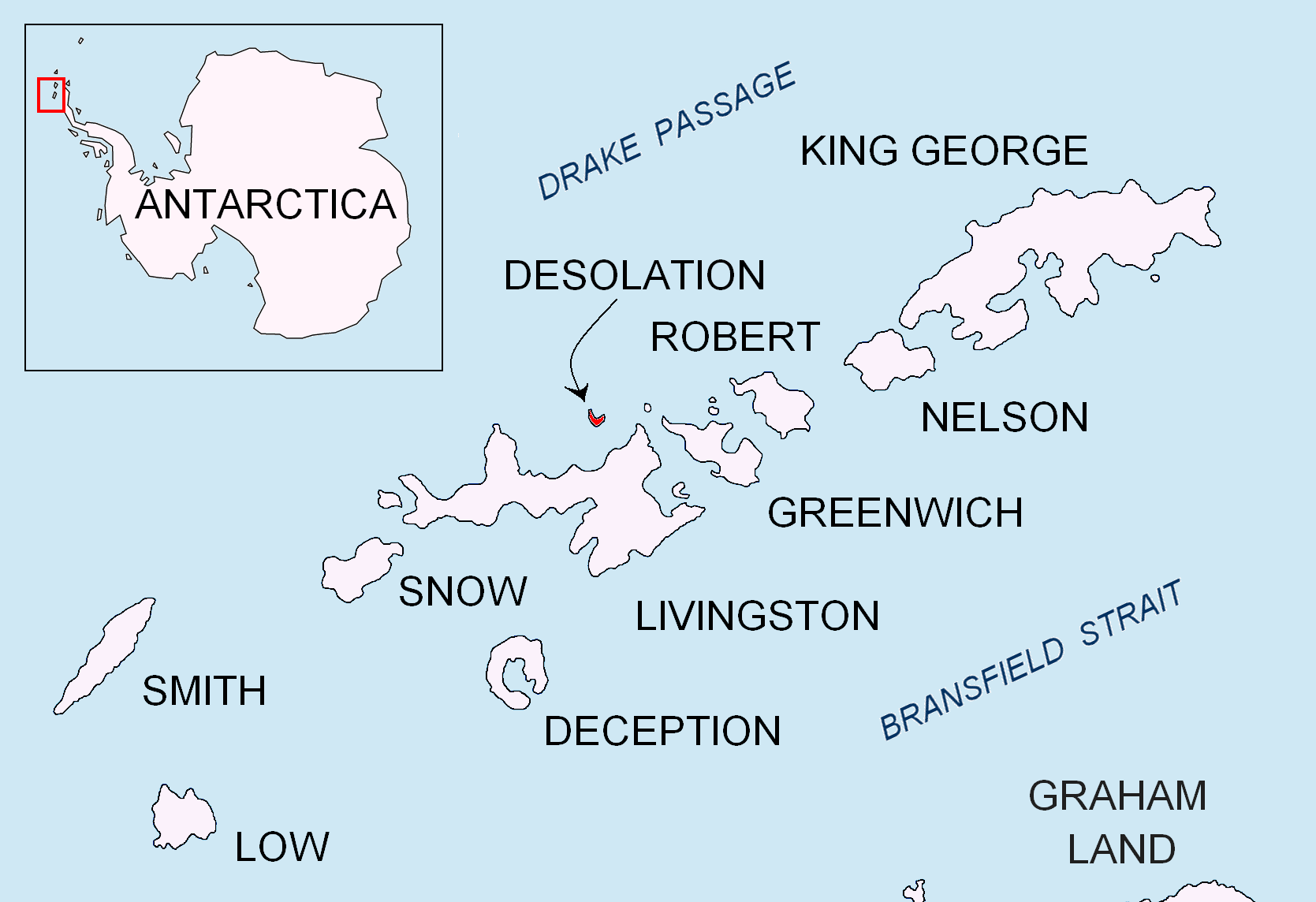
Location of Desolation Island in the South Shetland Islands.

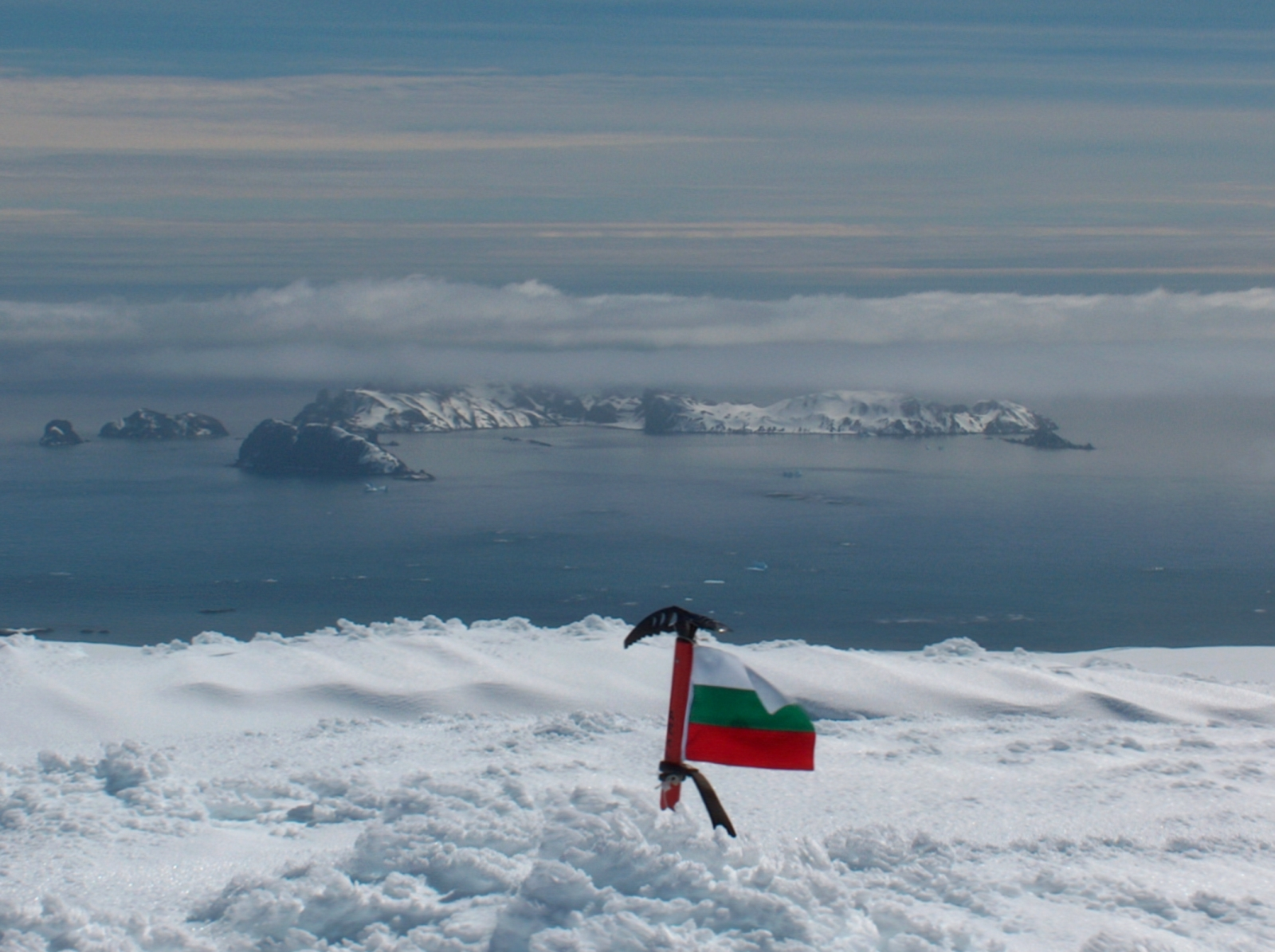
Blythe Bay and Desolation Island from Vidin Heights, Livingston Island

Topographic map of Livingston Island.

Blythe Bay (62°28′S 60°20′W) is an anchorage at the southeast side of Desolation Island, lying north of Livingston Island in the South Shetland Islands, Antarctica. The bay is bounded by Craggy Island to the northeast, Desolation Island to the northwest, the Miladinovi Islets to the west and Wood Island to the south.

The feature was known to American and British sealers as Blythe Bay as early as 1821. In the 1930s, however, the name was applied to a large bay between Williams Point and Cape Shirreff (now Hero Bay). This error has now been rectified and the name Blythe Bay is approved as originally used. The name is probably after Blythe (now Blyth), England, home of William Smith who reported the discovery of the South Shetland Islands in 1819.

== Maps ==
- Chart of South Shetland including Coronation Island, &c. from the exploration of the sloop Dove in the years 1821 and 1822 by George Powell Commander of the same. Scale ca. 1:200000. London: Laurie, 1822.
- South Shetland Islands. Scale 1:200000 topographic map No. 5657. DOS 610 – W 62 60. Tolworth, UK, 1968.
- Islas Livingston y Decepción. Mapa topográfico a escala 1:100000. Madrid: Servicio Geográfico del Ejército, 1991.
- L.L. Ivanov et al. Antarctica: Livingston Island and Greenwich Island, South Shetland Islands. Scale 1:100000 topographic map. Sofia: Antarctic Place-names Commission of Bulgaria, 2005.
- L.L. Ivanov. Antarctica: Livingston Island and Greenwich, Robert, Snow and Smith Islands. Scale 1:120000 topographic map. Troyan: Manfred Wörner Foundation, 2009. ISBN 978-954-92032-6-4
- Antarctic Digital Database (ADD). Scale 1:250000 topographic map of Antarctica. Scientific Committee on Antarctic Research (SCAR). Since 1993, regularly updated.
- L.L. Ivanov. Antarctica: Livingston Island and Smith Island. Scale 1:100000 topographic map. Manfred Wörner Foundation, 2017. ISBN 978-619-90008-3-0
