= Siddins Point =

Area of Livingston Island in Antarctica

Location of Livingston Island in the South Shetland Islands.

Topographic map of Livingston Island.

Siddins Point (62°32′41.8″S 60°26′05″W) is a point projecting into the middle of the head of Hero Bay on the north coast of Livingston Island in the South Shetland Islands, Antarctica. Named by the United Kingdom Antarctic Place-Names Committee (UK-APC) in 1958 for Captain Richard Siddins, Master of the Australian sealer Lynx of Sydney, who visited the South Shetland Islands in 1820-21 and 1821–22. Until 2011 the name was incorrectly spelt 'Siddons Point'.

== Maps ==
- L.L. Ivanov et al. Antarctica: Livingston Island and Greenwich Island, South Shetland Islands. Scale 1:100000 topographic map. Sofia: Antarctic Place-names Commission of Bulgaria, 2005.
- L.L. Ivanov. Antarctica: Livingston Island and Greenwich, Robert, Snow and Smith Islands. Scale 1:120000 topographic map. Troyan: Manfred Wörner Foundation, 2009. ISBN 978-954-92032-6-4
