= Desolation Island (South Shetland Islands) =

Island in Antarctica

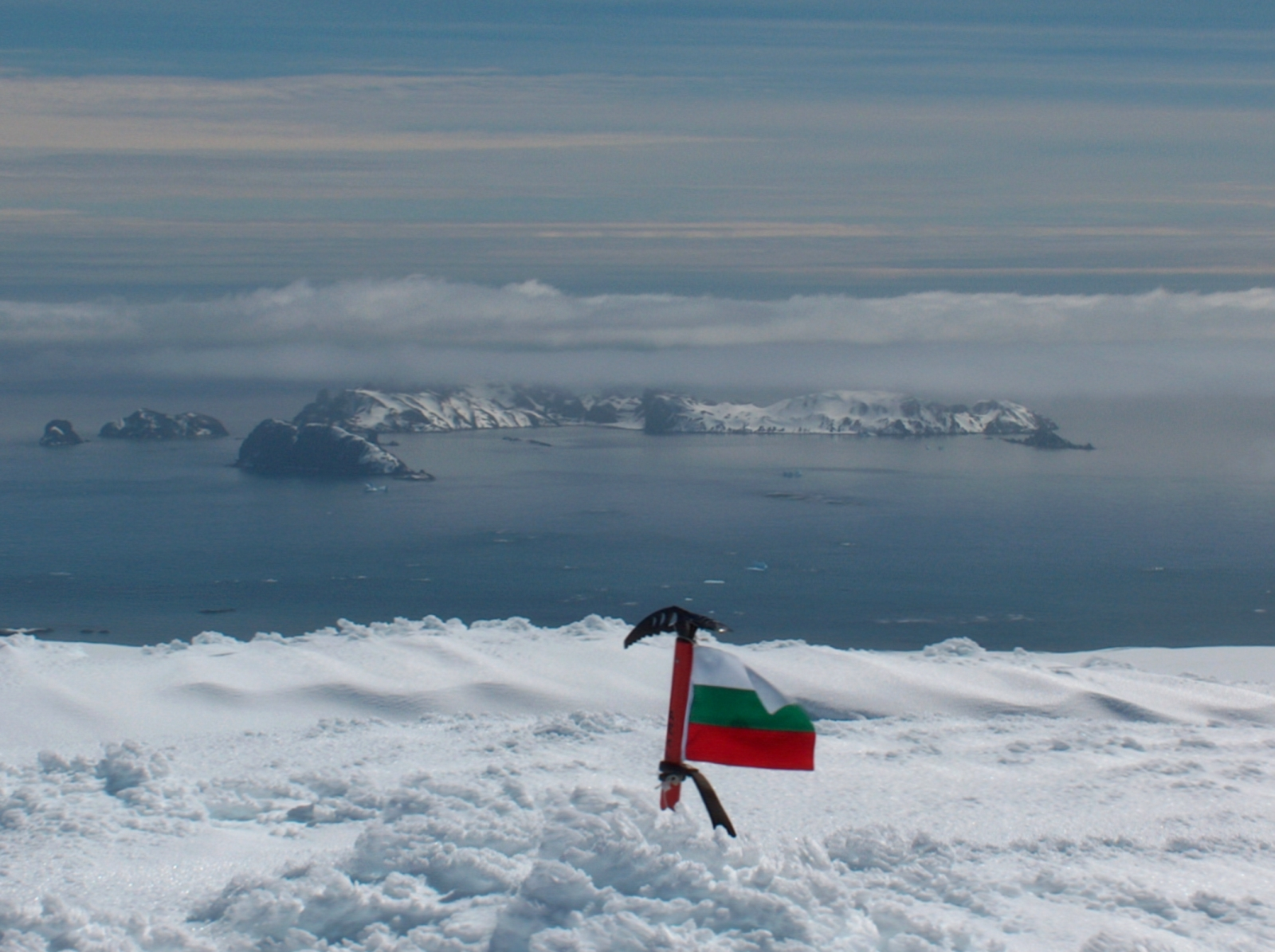
- Desolation Island and Blythe Bay from Vidin Heights, Livingston Island

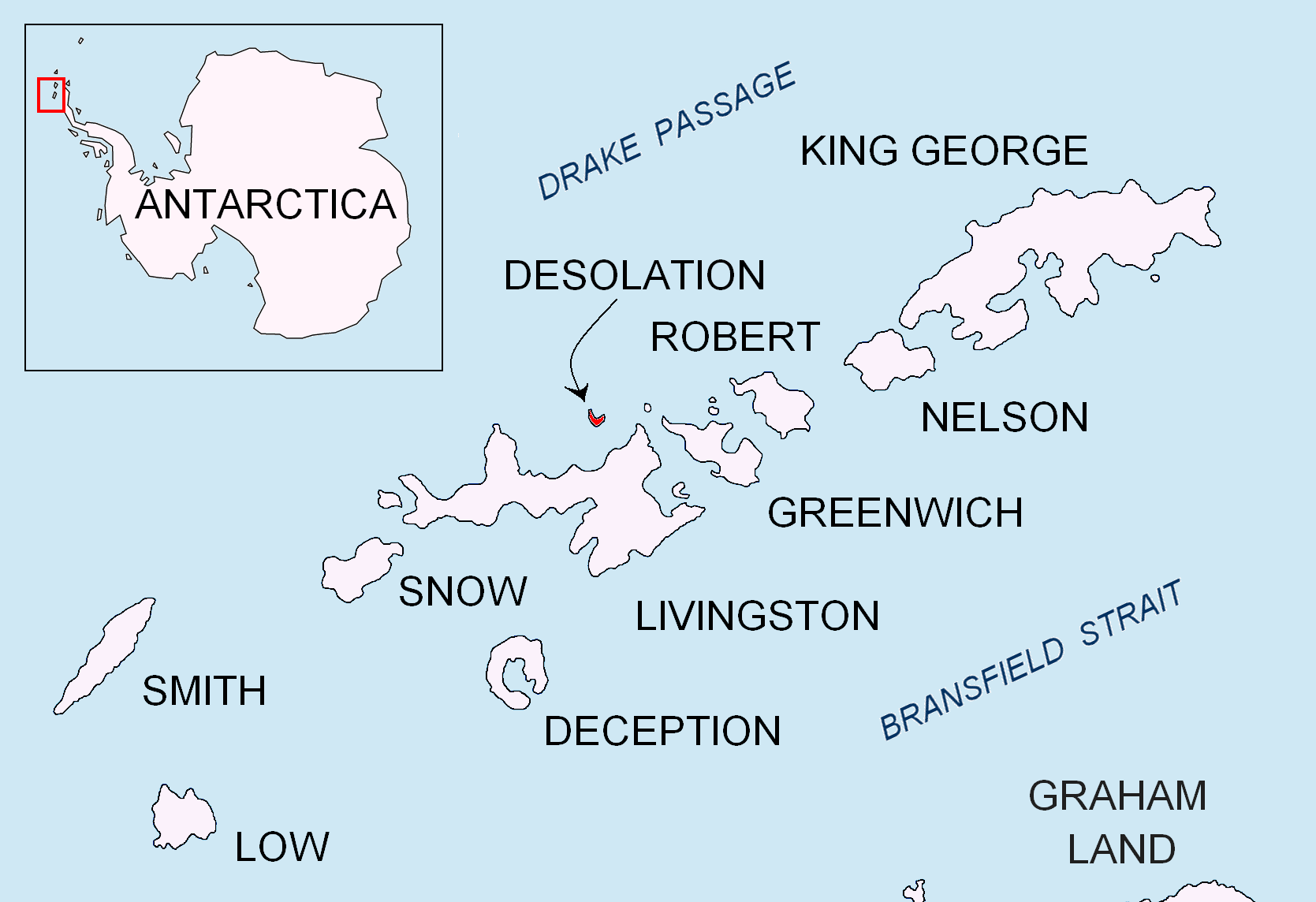

Geography
- Location: Antarctica
- Coordinates: 62°27′27.9″S 60°20′48.3″W
- Archipelago: South Shetland Islands
- Area: 3.12 km^{2} (1.20 sq mi)

Administration
- Administered under the Antarctic Treaty System

Demographics
- Population: Uninhabited

Topographic map of Livingston Island and Smith Island

Desolation Island is one of the minor islands in the South Shetlands archipelago, Antarctica situated at the entrance to Hero Bay, Livingston Island. The island is V-shaped with its northern coast indented by Kozma Cove. Surface area is 3.12 square kilometres (1.20 sq mi).

The island was discovered on 15 October 1819 by Captain William Smith in the English merchant brig Williams during his second visit to the islands. The anchorage Blythe Bay at the southeast side of Desolation Island was frequented by the early nineteenth century English and American sealers.

== Location ==
The island's midpoint is located at 62°27′27.9″S 60°20′48.3″W, with the island lying 6.9 km (4.3 mi) northwest of Kotis Point, 8.7 km (5.4 mi) west of Williams Point and 9.7 km (6.0 mi) north-northeast of Siddins Point. British mapping in 1820 and 1968, Chilean in 1971, Argentine in 1980, and Bulgarian in 2005 and 2009.

== See also ==
- Composite Gazetteer of Antarctica – Authoritative international gazetteer containing all the Antarctic toponyms
- List of Antarctic and subantarctic islands
- Livingston Island – Island in Antarctica
- Scientific Committee on Antarctic Research (SCAR) – British organization
- Territorial claims in Antarctica

== Maps ==
- Chart of South Shetland including Coronation Island, &c. from the exploration of the sloop Dove in the years 1821 and 1822 by George Powell Commander of the same. Scale ca. 1:200000. London: Laurie, 1822.
- South Shetland Islands. Scale 1:200000 topographic map No. 5657. DOS 610 – W 62 60. Tolworth, UK, 1968.
- Islas Livingston y Decepción. Mapa topográfico a escala 1:100000. Madrid: Servicio Geográfico del Ejército, 1991.
- L.L. Ivanov et al. Antarctica: Livingston Island and Greenwich Island, South Shetland Islands. Scale 1:100000 topographic map. Sofia: Antarctic Place-names Commission of Bulgaria, 2005.
- L.L. Ivanov. Antarctica: Livingston Island and Greenwich, Robert, Snow and Smith Islands. Scale 1:120000 topographic map. Troyan: Manfred Wörner Foundation, 2009. ISBN 978-954-92032-6-4
- Antarctic Digital Database (ADD). Scale 1:250000 topographic map of Antarctica. Scientific Committee on Antarctic Research (SCAR). Since 1993, regularly updated.
- L.L. Ivanov. Antarctica: Livingston Island and Smith Island. Scale 1:100000 topographic map. Manfred Wörner Foundation, 2017. ISBN 978-619-90008-3-0
