= List of sea captains =

This is a list of sea captains. The list includes merchant ship's captains as well as naval ship's captains. It is limited to those notable in this role (those who already have Wikipedia articles).

Image	About	Nationality	Merchant	Naval	Born	Died
	Adams, William English navigator who is believed to be the first Briton to reach Japan, becoming a key naval advisor to Tokugawa Ieyasu.	England		Yes	1564	1620
	Alcaraz, Ramon A Filipino naval officer decorated for his heroism as part of the Offshore Patrol unit of the U.S. Army Forces (USAFFE) during WW2 and considered to be the father of the Philippine Marine Corps.	Philippines		Yes	1915	2009
	Alexanderson, Leroy Last captain of SS United States, the biggest ocean liner ever built entirely in the United States and fastest passenger liner crossing the Atlantic Ocean in regular service.	United States	Yes		1910	2004
	Aruga, Kōsaku Japanese naval officer who participated in World War II. Known for his participation in the Battle of Leyte Gulf.	Japan		Yes	1897	1945
	Bainbridge, William Commodore in the U.S Navy, notable for his victory over HMS Java during the War of 1812.	United States		Yes	1774	1833
	Barney, Joshua Commodore in the U.S Navy who served in the Revolutionary War and the War of 1812.	United States		Yes	1759	1818
	Barron, James An American who served in the Virginia State Navy during the last years of the American Revolution and commissioned in the new U.S. Navy.	United States		Yes	1769	1851
	Barron, Samuel American naval officer of the U.S. Navy and later Confederate Navy, acting as a representative in Europe for the Confederacy during the Civil War.	Confederate States of America		Yes	1809	1888
	Barry, John Officer in the Continental Navy and later in the U.S. Navy.	United States		Yes	1745	1803
	Beebe, James. 19th-century American Sandy Hook Pilot. Known for being the longest serving Sandy Hook-New Jersey pilot, having served for 55 years as a Sandy Hook pilot.	United States			1827	1917
	Bering, Vitus Danish-born navigator in the service of the Russian Navy. The first European to discover Alaska. Many geographical features in the area are named for the explorer.	Denmark		Yes	1681	1741
	Berwick, Thomas A third generation Scottish master mariner until he was found guilty of scuttling his ship and sentenced to twenty years transportation in Australia.	United Kingdom	Yes		1825	1891
	Blanchard, Phineas Banning Among the last of the American merchant trade tall ship sea captains, commanded the barks Herbert Black and Willard Mudget and the ship Bangalore.	United States	Yes		1879	1962
	Blake, Peter New Zealand yachtsman who won the Whitbread Race, Jules Verne Trophy, and led New Zealand to successive victories in the America's Cup.	New Zealand			1948	2001
	Bligh, William Royal Navy officer known for the mutiny that occurred during his command of HMS Bounty. Bligh successfully navigated the ship's launch 6,700km to safety after being set adrift by the mutineers.	Great Britain		Yes	1754	1817
	de la Bodega y Quadra, Juan Francisco Spanish Criollo naval officer born in Peru. Explored the Northwest Coast of North America as far north as present day Alaska. Bodega Bay is named for him.	Spain		Yes	1743	1794
	Brown, William Irish-born, "father of the Argentine Navy", victorious in the Independence War, the Cisplatine War, and the Guerra Grande in Uruguay	Argentina		Yes	1777	1857
	Buchanan, Franklin American naval officer who served as an admiral in the Confederate Navy during the Civil War, and commanded the ironclad CSS Virginia.	Confederate States of America		Yes	1800	1874
	Cabral, Pedro Álvares Portuguese explorer and navigator, generally regarded as the European discoverer of Brazil.	Portugal		Yes	1467	1520
	Calamai, Piero Italian master aboard SS Andrea Doria at time of her fatal collision with MS Stockholm.	Italy	Yes		1901	1972
	Campbell, Peter Irish-born founder of the Uruguayan Navy.	Uruguay		Yes	1780	1832
	Chung-Hoon, Gordon Chinese/Hawaiian-American naval officer. First Asian-American to obtain flag rank. Distinguished for his command of USS Sigsbee in WW2 and honored with an Arleigh Burke-class destroyer named in his honor.	United States		Yes	1910	1979
	Columbus, Christopher Genoese navigator, colonizer, and explorer whose voyages across the Atlantic Ocean, on behalf of Spain, led to general European awareness of the Americas.	Genoa	Yes		1451	1506
	Comstock, Andrew 19th-century maritime pilot best known for the captain of Columbia and Magic in the America's Cup.	United States			1828	1910
	Cook, James British explorer, cartographer and naval officer famous for his pioneering voyages in the Pacific Ocean to New Zealand, Australia, and Hawaii.	Great Britain	Yes	Yes	1728	1779
	Cooper, Thomas 19th-century American maritime pilot best known for piloting battleships built at the Boston Navy Yard on their initial seatrials.	United States			1833	1906
	Coram, Thomas Sea captain who later operated a ship building business at Taunton, Massachusetts.	Great Britain	Yes		1668	1751
	Cushing, William American naval officer, best known for sinking the Confederate ironclad CSS Albemarle, a feat for which he received the thanks of Congress.	United States		Yes	1842	1874
	Decatur, Stephen American naval officer notable for his heroism in the First and Second Barbary Wars, and in the War of 1812. The youngest man to reach the rank of captain in the U.S. Navy.	United States		Yes	1779	1820
	Đỗ, Kiếm South Vietnamese naval officer who secretly organised the evacuation of over 30,000 refugees aboard 32 South Vietnamese navy ships during the Fall of Saigon, preventing those ships from falling into the hands of North Vietnamese.	(South Vietnam) Republic of Vietnam		Yes	1933	
	Drake, Francis English privateer, navigator, slaver, and politician of the Elizabethan era. Known for circumnavigating the globe in command of Golden Hind.	England	Yes	Yes	ca. 1540	1595
	Duff, George Distinguished British naval officer of the American Revolutionary War and the Napoleonic Wars.	Great Britain		Yes	1764	1805
	Erikson, Leif Norse explorer thought to be the first European to set foot on continental North America, prior to Christopher Columbus.	Norse			c. 970	c. 1025
	Farragut, David American naval officer, the first admiral in the United States Navy. He is remembered for his order at the Battle of Mobile Bay, "Damn the torpedoes, full speed ahead".	United States		Yes	1801	1870
	Elcano, Juan Sebastián Spanish Basque navigator and explorer best known for taking command and completing the first circumnavigation of the world following Magellan's demise.	Spain		Yes	1476	1526
	FitzRoy, Robert British captain of HMS Beagle during Charles Darwin's famous voyage, and as a pioneering meteorologist who revolutionized the art of weather forecasting.	United Kingdom		Yes	1805	1865
	Flavel, George One of the first licensed marine pilots in the state of Oregon. Flavel would go on to amass a fortune with a business managing pilot boats on the Columbia River.	United States			1850	1893
	Fryatt, Charles Master of the Great Eastern Railway's steamship Brussels, and he was shot by the Germans in 1916 after he used his ship to try and ram U-33.	United Kingdom	Yes		1872	1916
	da Gama, Vasco Portuguese explorer, one of the most successful in the European Age of Discovery and the commander of the first ships to sail directly from Europe to India.	Portugal	Yes		ca. 1460–1469	1524
	Garibaldi, Giuseppe Italian patriot, Italian shipmaster and merchant marine deep-sea captain. He is celebrated as one of the greatest generals of modern times and as the "Hero of the Two Worlds" because of his military enterprises in South America and Europe. He fought in numerous military campaigns that led to the Italian unification	Italy	Yes		1807	1882
	Genda, Minoru Japanese naval officer during World War II, and was considered one of the most successful naval strategists of the Imperial Japanese Navy, including that of the attack on Pearl Harbor.	Japan		Yes	1904	1989
	Gower, Richard Hall English mariner, empirical philosopher, nautical inventor, entrepreneur, and humanitarian.	Great Britain	Yes		1768	1833
	Gravely, Samuel American naval officer. The first African American in the U.S. Navy to command a Navy ship, the first fleet commander, and the first to become a flag officer, retiring as a vice admiral.	United States		Yes	1922	2004
	Greenlaw, Linda American author and at the time, the only female swordfishing boat captain on the East Coast of the United States. She was featured in the 1997 book The Perfect Storm and the film The Perfect Storm.	United States	Yes		1960	
	Guan, Tianpei Chinese admiral of the Qing dynasty and "Commander-in-Chief of Naval Forces". Established courteous relations with British Rear-Admiral Frederick Maitland. Fought in the First and Second Battle of Chuenpi, and the Battle of the Bogue.	Qing dynasty		Yes	1781	1841
	Halpin, Robert Captained the Brunel-designed leviathan SS Great Eastern, which laid transoceanic telegraph cables in the late 19th century.	Ireland	Yes		1836	1894
	Hara, Tameichi Japanese naval commander during the Pacific War and the author of the IJN manual on torpedo attack techniques.	Japan		Yes	1900	1980
	Hashimoto, Mochitsura Commander of the Japanese submarine I-58 which sank USS Indianapolis, the single greatest disaster in US naval history.	Japan		Yes	1909	2000
	Hazelwood, Joseph Captain of Exxon Valdez at the time of its 1989 oil spill.	United States	Yes		1946	
	Healy, Michael A. American Captain of the United States Revenue Cutter Service and the first African-American to command a ship of the United States government.	United States		Yes	1839	1904
	Hirose, Takeo Japanese naval officer during the Russo-Japanese War whose sacrifice elevated him to the status of national hero.	Japan		Yes	1868	1904
	Henderson, Joseph 19th-century American harbor pilot who guided large vessels into and out of New York Harbor as a Sandy Hook pilot.	United States			1826	1890
	Hudson, Henry English sea explorer and navigator, best known for his explorations of present-day Canada and the northeastern United States. Numerous geographical features have been named for him.	England	Yes		~1565	1611
	Hull, Isaac American naval officer who distinguished himself as XO aboard the frigate Constitution in the Quasi-War with France, and later as commander during her battle with HMS Guerriere during the War of 1812.	United States	Yes	Yes	1773	1843
	Johnson, Irving An American sail training pioneer, adventurer, lecturer and writer, best known for his film Around Cape Horn, and seven circumavigations of the world, each time with an amateur crew of students.	United States	Yes	Yes	1905	1991
	Jones, Christopher English captain of the 1620 voyage of the Pilgrim ship Mayflower to establish the Plymouth Colony.	England	Yes		c. 1570	1622
	Johnstone, George British mariner and naval officer, later serving as Member of Parliament.	Great Britain	Yes	Yes	1730	1787
	Jones, Catesby ap Roger American naval officer who joined the Confederate Navy during the American Civil War.	Confederate States of America		Yes	1821	1887
	Jones, John Paul Scottish sailor and the United States' first well-known naval officer during the American Revolution.	United States	Yes	Yes	1747	1792
	Jones, Thomas ap Catesby American naval officer during the War of 1812 and the Mexican–American War. Distinguished for his bravery during the Battle of Lake Borgne.	United States		Yes	1790	1858
	Jong, Piet de Decorated Dutch naval officer and submarine commander during World War II. Later served as Prime Minister of the Netherlands.	Netherlands		Yes	1915	2016
	Kapahulehua, Kawika Hawaiian sailor who was the first to captain the Polynesian voyaging canoe Hōkūleʻa from Hawaii to Tahiti using only traditional navigation techniques.	United States	Yes		1930	2007
	Kaishū, Katsu Japanese naval officer and statesman during the end of the Tokugawa shogunate into the Meiji restoration.	Japan		Yes	1823	1899
	Kelley, Beverly American Coast Guard officer who was the first woman appointed to command an American military vessel, the patrol boat USCGC Cape Newagen, in 1979.	United States		Yes	~1954	
	Khương, Hữu Bá Highly decorated South Vietnamese naval officer with numerous "command-at-sea" posts, including accepting and delivering the first Vietnamese Navy ship across the Pacific from the US.	(South Vietnam) Republic of Vietnam		Yes	1930	2015
	Killick, James Captain of the tea clipper Challenger and founder of the firm Killick Martin & Company. He became affectionately known as the ‘China Bird’ and the ‘Admiral’.	United Kingdom	Yes	No	1816	1889
	Kountouriotis, Pavlos Greek naval admiral and commander of the Hellenic Navy during the Balkan Wars and World War I, Later became the first and third President of Greece.	Greece		Yes	1855	1935
	Kuki, Yoshitaka Japanese naval commander during Japan's Sengoku Period, under Oda Nobunaga, and later, Toyotomi Hideyoshi.	Japan		Yes	1542	1600
	LaRue, Leonard American captain of the SS Meredith Victory, a U.S. Merchant Marine cargo ship that evacuated over 14,000 refugees during the Korean War, the largest humanitarian rescue operation by a single ship in history.	United States	Yes		1914	2001
	Le Lacheur, William Sea captain from Guernsey widely credited as having transformed the economy of Costa Rica by establishing the Costa Rican coffee trade.	United Kingdom	Yes		1802	1863
	Ladd, William American anti-war activist and New England sea captain who devoted his pen to preaching non-resistance during the War of 1812.	United States	Yes		1778	1841
	Lawrence, James American naval hero. During the War of 1812, he commanded USS Chesapeake against HMS Shannon. Best known today for his dying command "Don't give up the ship!".	United States		Yes	1781	1813
	De Lezo, Blas A Spanish naval officer best remembered for the Battle of Cartagena de Indias where Spanish forces under his command decisively defeated a large British invasion.	Spain		Yes	1689	1741
	von Luckner, Felix A German nobleman, naval officer, author, and sailor who earned the epithet Der Seeteufel (the Sea Devil) for his exploits in command of the sailing commerce raider SMS Seeadler (Sea Eagle) during the First World War.	German Empire		Yes	1881	1966
	Macdonough, Thomas American naval officer. Macdonough's actions during the decisive Battle of Lake Champlain are often cited as a model of tactical preparation and execution.	United States	Yes	Yes	1783	1825
	Magellan, Ferdinand Portuguese maritime explorer who led the first circumnavigational expedition, and located the eponymous Strait of Magellan. He was also the first European to reach the Philippines.	Portugal		Yes	1480	1521
	Matsuoka, Bankichi Japanese naval officer in the Tokugawa Navy during the Boshin War, serving as Captain of the Japanese warship Banryū during the Battle of Hakodate.	Japan		Yes	1841	1871
	Maynard, Robert British naval officer best known for defeating the pirate Blackbeard by luring him to board an unarmed sloop with most of his crew hidden below deck.	Great Britain		Yes	1684	1751
	McGiffen, Philo American naval officer who served in Chinese service as a naval advisor during the First Sino-Japanese War. He proved a talented tactician during the Battle of the Yalu as well being as the first American to command a modern battleship in wartime.	United States		Yes	1860	1897
	McGrath, Kathleen A. American naval officer who was the first woman to command a U.S. Navy ship as commander of USS Recovery in 1993. In 1998, she was appointed commander of USS Jarrett, one of the first women to command a combat ship in the U.S. Navy.	United States		Yes	1952	2002
Francisco Xavier de Mendonça Furtado, Governor of Grão Pará. 18th century painting. Artist unknown.	Mendonça Furtado, Francisco Xavier de Portuguese nobleman who served in the armed services for 16 years rising from the rank of soldier to sea captain. Involved in several military actions including the Spanish–Portuguese War of 1735 Appointed in 1751 as governor of north Brazil's State of Grão-Pará and Maranhão, and in 1759 as Secretary of State in Lisbon.	Portugal		Yes	1701	1769
	Mulzac, Hugh First African American to command a vessel in the United States Merchant Marine.	United States	Yes		1886	1971
	Murphy, Richard New England fishing schooner captain, noted for surviving a series of close calls at sea.	United States	Yes		1838	1916
	Naihekukui Known as "Captain Jack" or "Jack the Pilot" to visitors, served as Honolulu harbor master and admiral of the royal fleet in the early Kingdom of Hawaii.	Hawaii		Yes	c. 1790s	1825
	Nelson, Horatio British naval officer known for his leadership, strategy, and unconventional tactics during the Napoleonic Wars. Widely regarded as one of the greatest naval commanders in history.	Great Britain		Yes	1758	1805
	Nelson, William U.S. Navy officer and later a Union general in the American Civil War. He holds the distinction of being the only naval officer to achieve the rank of major general on either side of the Civil War.	United States		Yes	1824	1862
	de Neumann, Bernard Peter Awarded a George Medal for his actions during an air attack by the Luftwaffe; Convicted of piracy by Vichy French; Instigator and overseer of the installation of the Thames Navigation Service.	United Kingdom	Yes	Yes	1917	1972
	Newport, Christopher English seaman and privateer. Captain of the Susan Constant and commander of the 1607 Virginia Company voyage to establish the first North American settlement at Jamestown.	England	Yes		1561	1617
	Noonan, Fred British-American merchant mariner and Royal Navy officer, working his way up from ordinary seaman to merchant captain. Later worked as a flight navigator and disappeared with Amelia Earhart during their World Flight.	United States	Yes	Yes	1893	1937
	Oxilia, Italo Antifascist boat captain that rescued Italian Resistance members and politicians from Fascist Italy	Italy	Yes		1887	1971
	Pardo, Luis Captain of the Chilean steam tug Yelcho which rescued the 22 stranded crewmen of Sir Ernest Shackleton's ship Endurance from Antarctica.	Chile		Yes	1882	1935
	Parker, John One of the most successful arctic whalers to sail from Hull in the nineteenth century and for many years captain of the whale ship Truelove.	United Kingdom		Yes	1800	1867
	Pearson, Richard British naval officer who was captain of HMS Serapis during the American Revolution. He was defeated by John Paul Jones in a pivotal battle.	Great Britain		Yes	1731	1806
	Pellew, Edward British naval officer. Fought during the American and French Revolutionary Wars. Pellew makes a fictional appearances in the Horatio Hornblower novels.	Great Britain		Yes	1757	1833
	Perry, Matthew American naval officer who compelled the opening of Japan to the West with the Convention of Kanagawa in 1854.	United States		Yes	1794	1858
	Perry, Oliver Hazard American naval officer who served in the War of 1812 and earned the nickname "Hero of Lake Erie" for leading American forces in a decisive naval victory at the Battle of Lake Erie.	United States		Yes	1785	1819
	Phillips, Richard U.S. merchant mariner, shipmaster and author, who served as captain aboard MV Maersk Alabama during its hijacking by Somali pirates in April 2009.	United States	Yes		1955	
	Piailug, Mau Micronesian fisherman and navigator from Satawal, best known as a teacher of traditional, non-instrument wayfinding methods for open-ocean voyaging, sparking a Hawaiian cultural renaissance and ultimately preserving the art of Polynesian navigation.	Federated States of Micronesia			1932	2010
	Prat, Arturo Captain of Esmeralda, Prat was killed shortly after boarding the Peruvian armored monitor Huáscar at the Naval Battle of Iquique.	Chile		Yes	1848	1879
	Preble, Edward Officer in the United States Navy and United States Merchant Marine, participated in the Revolutionary War, the Quasi-War with France, and the First Barbary War.	United States	Yes	Yes	1761	1807
	Raleigh, Walter English sailor, writer and explorer. North American explorer, confidant of Elizabeth I, builder of the English galleon, Ark Royal.	England	Yes	Yes	1552	1618
	Reid, Samuel Chester American naval officer during the War of 1812. Commanded the privateer General Armstrong and engaged gunboats from British en route to Jamaica and New Orleans.	United States	Yes	Yes	1783	1861
	Rinnan, Arne Norwegian captain of the MV Tampa who defied Australian government demands during the Tampa Affair, was later awarded the Nansen Refugee Award and the Royal Norwegian Order of Merit.	Norway	Yes		1940	
	Rodgers, John (War of 1812) American naval officer who served in the United States Navy from its organization in the 1790s through the late 1830s. His service included the Quasi-War with France and the War of 1812.	United States		Yes	1772	1838
	Rodgers, John (Civil War) Son of the above John Rodgers, also with a long career of distinguished service, commanding an expedition of Naval Infantry and Marines in Florida during the Seminole Wars and the North Pacific Exploring and Surveying Expedition.	United States		Yes	1812	1882
	Ross, Eliza Ann (née McGray) Wife of Captain David Larkin Ross aboard the "Reform" enroute to Buenos Aires, successfully assumed command of the ship upon David's death. Her brief command made her one of America's first female ship captains.	Canada			1849	1940
	Rostron, Arthur British captain for the Cunard Line and master of RMS Carpathia during her rescue RMS Titanic survivors. Rostron was awarded a Congressional Gold Medal and Order of the British Empire for his efforts, and was eventually made Commodore of the Cunard fleet.	United Kingdom	Yes		1869	1940
	Sakuma, Tsutomi Japanese naval officer who served during the Russo-Japanese War and one of the first submarine commanders of the Imperial Japanese Navy.	Japan		Yes	1879	1910
	Schettino, Francesco Captain of the ill fated cruise ship Costa Concordia.	Italy	Yes		1960	
	Seyburn, Isaac D. Welsh-American merchant captain who served as a naval officer during the American Civil War. Commanded the schooner USS Kittatinny as part of the West Gulf Blockading Squadron under David Farragut.	United States	Yes	Yes	1824	1895
	Seymour, Edward Hobart British Admiral of the Fleet. Took part in the capture of Canton and the attack on the Taku forts. Appointed commander-in-chief of the China Station, lead the Naval Brigade in the relief of Peking during the Boxer Rebellion.	United Kingdom		Yes	1840	1929
	Shchetinina, Anna Soviet merchant marine captain, often said to be the first western woman captain of an ocean-going ship	Soviet Union	Yes	No	1908	1999
	Shi, Yang Chinese pirate who took control of her husband's pirate confederation with personal command of 24 ships and over 1,400 pirates at the time of her retirement. Considered not only history's most successful female pirate, but one of the most successful pirates in history.	Qing dynasty			1775	1844
	Siddins, Richard Captain of Campbell Macquarie and one of the earliest and best known merchant ship captains sailing out of Port Jackson.	United Kingdom	Yes	Yes	1770	1846
	Smalls, Robert An African-American born into slavery in South Carolina, worked as a deckhand aboard CSS Planter. Commandeered the vessel and piloted it to Union lines. Then served as a pilot and captain in the Union Navy.	United States		Yes	1839	1915
	Smith, Edward Captain of RMS Titanic. Joined the White Star Shipping Line in March 1880 where he quickly rose in stature. Received his first White Star command, SS Republic in 1887.	United Kingdom	Yes	Yes	1850	1912
	Smith, William Captain of the brig Williams, when passing around Cape Horn he encountered strong headwinds and ventured south, discovering the South Shetland Islands, and later sighted the Antarctic.	United Kingdom	Yes		1779	1847
	Sohn, Won-yil South Korean merchant mariner who organized the Korean coast guard, providing the groundwork to stand up a Navy at the start of the Korean War, becoming the first Chief of Naval Operations and founder of the Republic of Korea Navy.	Korea	Yes	Yes	1909	1980
	Stockton, Robert Field American naval officer, notable in the capture of California during the Mexican–American War. Later served as a U.S. Senator.	United States		Yes	1795	1866
	Surcouf, Robert Captain and ship owner from St. Malo. Notable as French corsair during the Napoleonic Wars.	France	Yes	Yes	1773	1823
	von Tegetthoff, Wilhelm Austrian Captain and Fleet Commander of the Austro-Hungarian Fleet. Considered one of the prominent naval commanders of the 19th century, Tegetthoff was known for his innovative tactics as well as his inspirational leadership.	Austrian Empire		Yes	1827	1871
	Tōgō, Heihachirō One of Japan's greatest naval heroes known as "the Nelson of the East". As Commander-in-Chief during the Russo-Japanese War, he successfully routed Russian naval forces at Port Arthur and Tsushima.	Japan		Yes	1848	1934
	Truxton, Thomas American naval officer who operating as a privateer during the American Revolution, commanding several ships. After the war, he returned to the merchant marine, and in commanded one of the first American ships to engage in trade with China.	United States	Yes	Yes	1591	1659
	Tyrrell, Kate Irish captain of the schooner Denbighshire Lass. After inheriting her father's shipping company in the 1880s, Tyrrell fought to have her name on the documents of ownership for the schooner. Her career as sea captain spanned over twenty years, and Denbighshire Lass was the first ship to fly the Irish tricolour flag at a foreign port.	Ireland	Yes		1863	1921
	Walters, Angus Fishing schooner captain out of Lunenburg, Nova Scotia. He was a highliner fishing captain and captain of the schooner Bluenose, winning multiple races for the International Fisherman's Trophy.	Canada	Yes		1881	1968
	Welch, Martin Fishing schooner captain from Gloucester, Massachusetts. He was captain of the schooner Esperanto in 1920 when it defeated the Canadian schooner Delawana in the first International Fishing Schooner Championship Races in Halifax, Nova Scotia.	Canada	Yes		1864	1935
	Wilkes, Charles American naval officer and explorer. He is particularly noted for his 1838–1842 Pacific expedition as well as for his role in the Trent Affair during the Civil War.	United States		Yes	1798	1877
	Winslow, Perry Captain of the whaling vessels Phoenix and Edward Cary.	United States	Yes		1815	1890
	Woodget, Richard English sea captain, known as the master of the sailing clipper Cutty Sark during her most successful period of service in the wool trade between Australia and the United Kingdom.	United Kingdom	Yes		1845	1928
	Whitall, John M. Prominent Sea Captain, businessman and philanthropist in New Jersey and Pennsylvania involved in the spice and silk trade, Glass-making, and missionary work.	United States	Yes		1800	1877
	Yi, Sun-sin Korean admiral famed for his victories against the Japanese during the Imjin war. A brilliant naval strategist, Yi perfected use of the turtle ships and used sea tides and narrow straits to his advantage.	Joseon dynasty Korea		Yes	1371	1433
	Zheng, He Chinese mariner, explorer, diplomat and fleet admiral, who commanded Ming China's treasure voyages from 1405 to 1433.	Ming dynasty		Yes	1371	1433
	Zheng, Zhilong Chinese admiral, merchant, and pirate. Fluent in Portuguese, Chinese and Japanese. Worked with the Dutch East India Company, as a privateer overseeing an armada of four hundred junks and tens of thousands of men, controlling all shipping in the South China Sea.	Ming dynasty	Yes	Yes	1604	1661
Image	About	Nationality	Merchant	Naval	Born	Died

== Fictional sea captains ==
- Captain Ahab, fictional character and hero of Herman Melville's novel Moby-Dick
- Captain Jack Aubrey, hero of the Aubrey–Maturin series by Patrick O'Brian
- John Blackthorne, hero of James Clavell's 1975 novel Shōgun, based on William Adams
- Captain Birdseye, advertising mascot for the Birds Eye frozen food brand
- Cap'n Crunch, mascot character for the cereal of the same name
- Captain Gault, sea captain of a number of stories by English writer William Hope Hodgson
- Captain Haddock, captain in the comic album series The Adventures of Tintin
- Captain James Hook, captain in the play and novel Peter Pan
- Horatio Hornblower, protagonist of a series of novels by C. S. Forester
- Captain Jat, sea captain of a number of stories by English writer William Hope Hodgson
- Captain Horatio McCallister, recurring character from the TV series The Simpsons
- Captain Nemo, a submarine captain first introduced in Jules Verne's Twenty Thousand Leagues Under the Seas
- Captain Pugwash, captain of pirate ship in a cartoon of the same name
- Captain Alexander Smollett, the captain of the schooner Hispaniola in Robert Louis Stevenson's Treasure Island.
- Captain Jack Sparrow, captain of the pirate ship Black Pearl in Pirates of the Caribbean films
- Cap'n Turbot, a character in the Canadian TV series PAW Patrol

== See also ==
- Bibliography of early American naval history
- Bibliography of 18th-19th century Royal Naval history
- List of single-ship actions
