= Campbell Macquarie (ship) =

At least three sailing ships have been named Campbell Macquarie:

- Campbell Macquarie (1812 shipwreck), 235 or 248 tons (bm), built at Calcutta, India. Wrecked near Macquarie Island in 1812.
- Campbell Macquarie, 133 ton (bm) square-rigged ship built in 1813 by Samuel Gunn at Hobart Town.
- Campbell Macquarie, a vessel that the former master of the first vessel above sailed to Sydney with merchandise from Bengal, arriving 30 June 1814. She then left on 27 July for Fiji.
