= Richard Siddins =

Australian master mariner and lighthouse keeper

- Born: 1770; County Louth, Ireland
- Died: 2 July 1846 (aged 75–76); New South Wales, Australia
- Occupations: Ship captain, harbour pilot, lighthouse keeper
- Known for: Siddins Point
- Partner(s): Catherina Keenan (1804–1809), Eleanor Cooper (1809–?), Jane Powell (1816–1846)

Richard Siddins (1770–1846) was an Australian master mariner, harbour pilot and lighthouse keeper.

== Biography ==
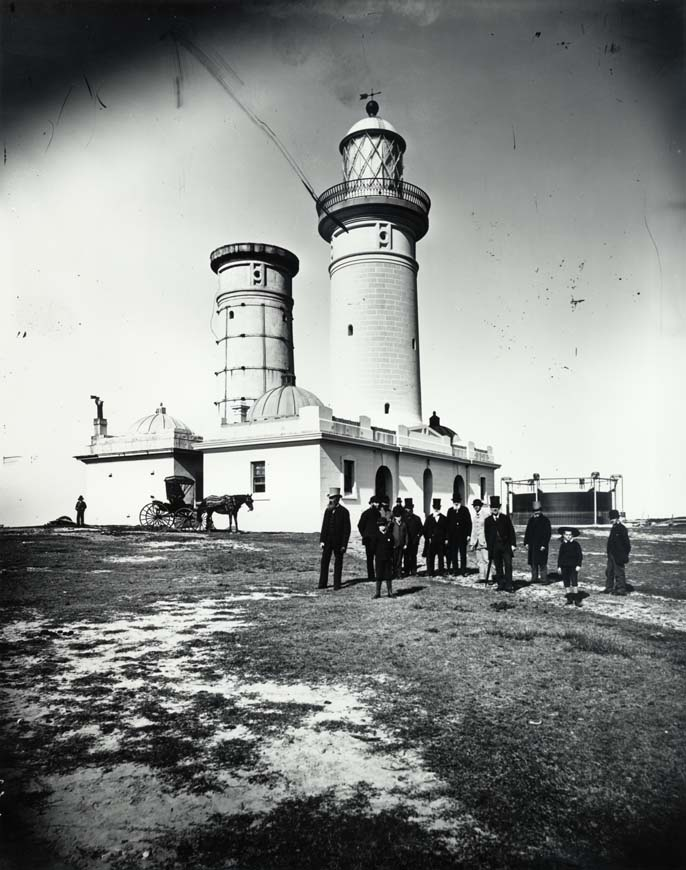
Macquarie Lighthouse old and new removed lantern

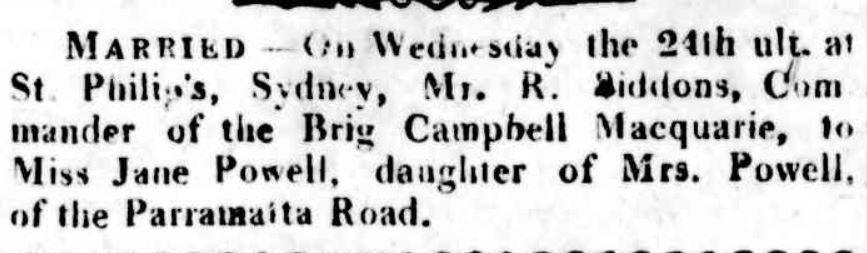
Marriage notice of Richard Siddins in 1816

Richard Siddins was born in 1770 in County Louth, Ireland and died on 2 July 1846 in New South Wales, Australia. He travelled extensively in his work as a merchant ship's master, merchant sailor, ship's pilot & lighthouse keeper. He had three sons and ten daughters from three different wives. He had been married to Catherine Keenan (1804) and Eleanor Cooper (1809) becoming the father of William Keenan and Rebecca Cooper.

On 24 April 1816 he married Jane Powell, daughter of Edward Powell, in the Church of St. Philip's, Sydney. At the time Siddins was 45, while Jane was 16, although in the Church register it had been written Siddins was 35, and Jane 22. They had eleven children: Anne Jane (b. 15/01/1818), Augusta Maria (b. 28/12/1820), Joseph Richard (b. 30/04/1823), Mary Elizabeth (b. 18/06/1825), Jane (b. 04/09/1827), Isabella (b. 06/12/1829), Thomas (b. 11/12/1831), Elizabeth (b. 24/02/1834), Ellen (b. 13/12/1837), Maria Augusta (b. 28/12/1839) and Sophia (b. 31/10/1842) Siddins.

At the end of 1807 he became master of the King George; later he was employed as captain of the Campbell Macquarie by the ship-owner Joseph Underwood. This vessel was a 248-ton full-rigged ship, built at Kolkata, India. It was the first known shipwreck on Macquarie Island, when sailors were marooned for four months during 1812 with the loss of four Indian crew members. In 1823 Richard applied for the position of harbour pilot in Sydney. The couple's son Joseph was born the following year. He became superintendent of the South Head Lighthouse (also called Macquarie Lighthouse) in 1832. In 1804 he arrived in Port Jackson aboard a British whaler. From 1804 to 1824 he had been on many voyages around the Pacific Ocean and Southern Oceans and north to the Indies, Kolkata and Canton, first as mate or captain and later as part-owner of his ship. Some details can be extrapolated from several books on his adventurous life and Australian maritime commerce.

In the book Richard Siddins of Port Jackson, Lyndon Rose describes the details of the journeys by the small band of sea hunters in the first years of Australia's international trade. Siddins worked mainly for the Port Jackson merchants Lord, Kable and Underwood, ex-convicts who made their fortunes building Australia's export-import trade. In it there are some illustrations about Siddins' journeys but the author could find no likeness of Richard Siddins.

In The Canberra Times Helen Brown, reviewing Lyndon Rose's book, stated that there is no account of Siddins's life before he arrived in Port Jackson,

"...because no reliable information could be unearthed. So he remains a somewhat shadowy figure..."

— Helen Brown, The Canberra Times

The book Letter from Charles R. Siddins to H.F. Norrie, 1857 are letters that Siddin's grandson wrote to Harold F. Norrie. Norrie was a public servant who held several posts, including Secretary of the Sydney Harbour Trust, commissioner of the South Head Trust, and alderman of Vaucluse Council. The letters confirm that Captain Siddins built the Greenwich Pier (or Vaucluse Hotel) and after his death his son Joseph succeeded him as superintendent of the South Head lighthouse.

He was claimed as possibly the most important captain in the history of exploration from the book Log-Books and Journals with maps and illustrations by Ida Lee F.R.G.S and Hon. F.R.A.H.S. :

"...perhaps the greatest traveller of them all, who gave so much information concerning early Fiji, and delighted to hold mission services on board his ship in Sydney Harbour, and whom we find later in company with William Smith (mariner) and Robert Fildes in Blythe Bay, New South Shetland. ..."

— Ida Lee

== Voyages ==
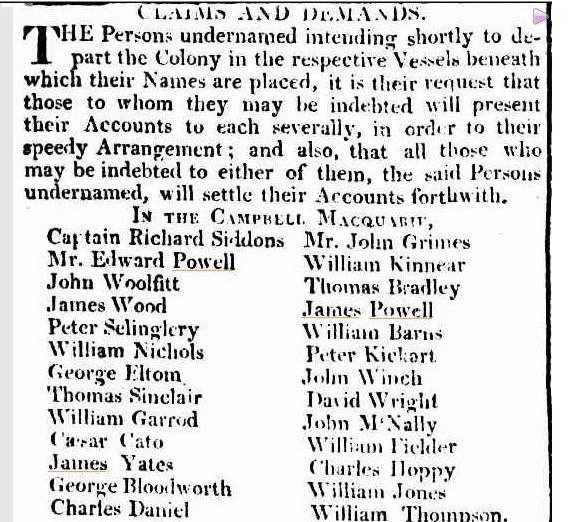
Campbell Macquarie crew list

Richard Siddins was one of the earliest and best known merchant sea captains sailing out of Port Jackson.

From 1804 to 1822 Siddins helped reap the vast harvest of seals and sandalwood on behalf of the Sydney traders. He took cargoes to China and India for them, and brought back Asian goods for the colonial stores. After many adventures in the Pacific and having survived the shipwreck of Macquarie Island, he became the Port Jackson pilot and later superintendent of the South Head Lighthouse. Richard Siddins arrived in Australia, to New South Wales, in 1804 aboard the English whaler Alexander. For many years he took part in trading voyages to Kolkata and the islands of the South Seas. He was in Port Jackson in 1806 aboard the King George and at the end of 1807 he brought cargoes of sandalwood, seal oil and seal furs to Port Jackson. From 1809 to 1815 Siddins was in the Fiji Islands. In Sydney, 1811, Siddins was employed by ship owner Joseph Underwood as Captain of the Campbell Macquarie. In 1811 and in 1812 Siddins returned to India on the Campbell Macquarie and later in that year arrived in Port Jackson with prisoners and a cargo of spirits. Soon after he again set out on the Campbell Macquarie on a sealing voyage to the South seas. They called at Kangaroo Island and collected seal skins and salt, then headed for Macquarie Island. He and his crew ended up being shipwrecked in Hasselborough Bay on 11 June 1812, and at least four of the castaways died. Twelve of them were rescued by the Perseverance, a ship that had arrived at Macquarie Island to collect a gang of sealers in October 1812. Joseph Underwood sent the ship Elizabeth and Mary to the Island to rescue the remaining crew. When Siddins landed on Macquarie island in 1812, he met the Russian explorer Fabian Gottlieb von Bellingshausen there. Richard Siddins returned to Sydney on 20 January with 1700 skins and rigging form the wreck of the Campbell Macquarie. From 1814

Lyndon Rose, with his book Richard Siddins of Port Jackson, has set down his story as a tribute to his contribution to the trade out of Port Jackson in the early days of the Colony.

== Bibliography ==
There are at least three books about Richard Siddins’ life and adventures:

- Letter from Charles R. Siddins to H.F. Norrie, undated, with newscutting, 1857
- Richard Siddins of Port Jackson / by Lyndon Rose.
- Richard Siddins pocket book and letter, 1815-1878

Letter from Charles R. Siddons concerning the career of his grandfather, Captain Richard Siddons, and his father Joseph Siddins. The letter states that Captain Siddins built the home which later became the Greenwich Pier or Vaucluse Hotel. His son Joseph succeeded him as superintendent of the South Head lighthouse. Also included is a newscutting of the poem 'The Wreck of the Dunbar' by George Ferris Pickering, which features the role of the dog of Joseph Siddins in the discovery of the shipwreck. The second one doesn't have the direct purpose to tell Siddins adventures but to describe how international trade was carried out in 1770 century. The last one is a pocket book, being an interleaved copy of the New South Wales pocket almanac for 1816 containing MS memoranda and tallies, and a set of letters that came from Sarah Wentworth to Mrs Siddins from Vaucluse, N.S.W., 6 February 1878.

== Death ==
In 1832, he was compelled by ill health to exchange his situation as pilot with the superintendent of the South Head lighthouse. He died on 2 July 1846, aged 76. His wife died on 9 February 1883, and was buried at Richmond cemetery and his son, Joseph Richard (1823–1891), became a pilot at South Head.

== Curiosities ==
In his honour, Siddins Point, which projects into the middle of the head of Hero Bay on the north coast of Livingston Island in the South Shetland Islands was named for him by the United Kingdom Antarctic Place-Names Committee in 1958. Up until 2011, the name was incorrectly spelled "Siddons Point".

== See also ==
- List of sea captains
- List of shipwrecks of Tasmania
