= Oxilia =

Oxilia (Italian: [okˈsiːlja], Ligurian: [uˈʒiːlja]) is an Italian surname from Liguria. Notable people with the surname include:

- Giovanni Battista Oxilia (1887–1953), Italian general during World War II
- Italo Oxilia (1887–1971), Italian anti-fascist militant
- José Oxilia (1861–1919), Uruguayan operatic tenor
- Nino Oxilia (1889–1917), Italian playwright, screenwriter and film director
- Tommaso Oxilia (born 1998), Italian basketball player

== See also ==
- Auxilia
