= William Smith (mariner) =

19th-century English captain and Antarctic explorer

- Born: 1790; Blyth, Northumberland, England
- Died: 1847 (aged 56–57)
- Occupation: Ship captain

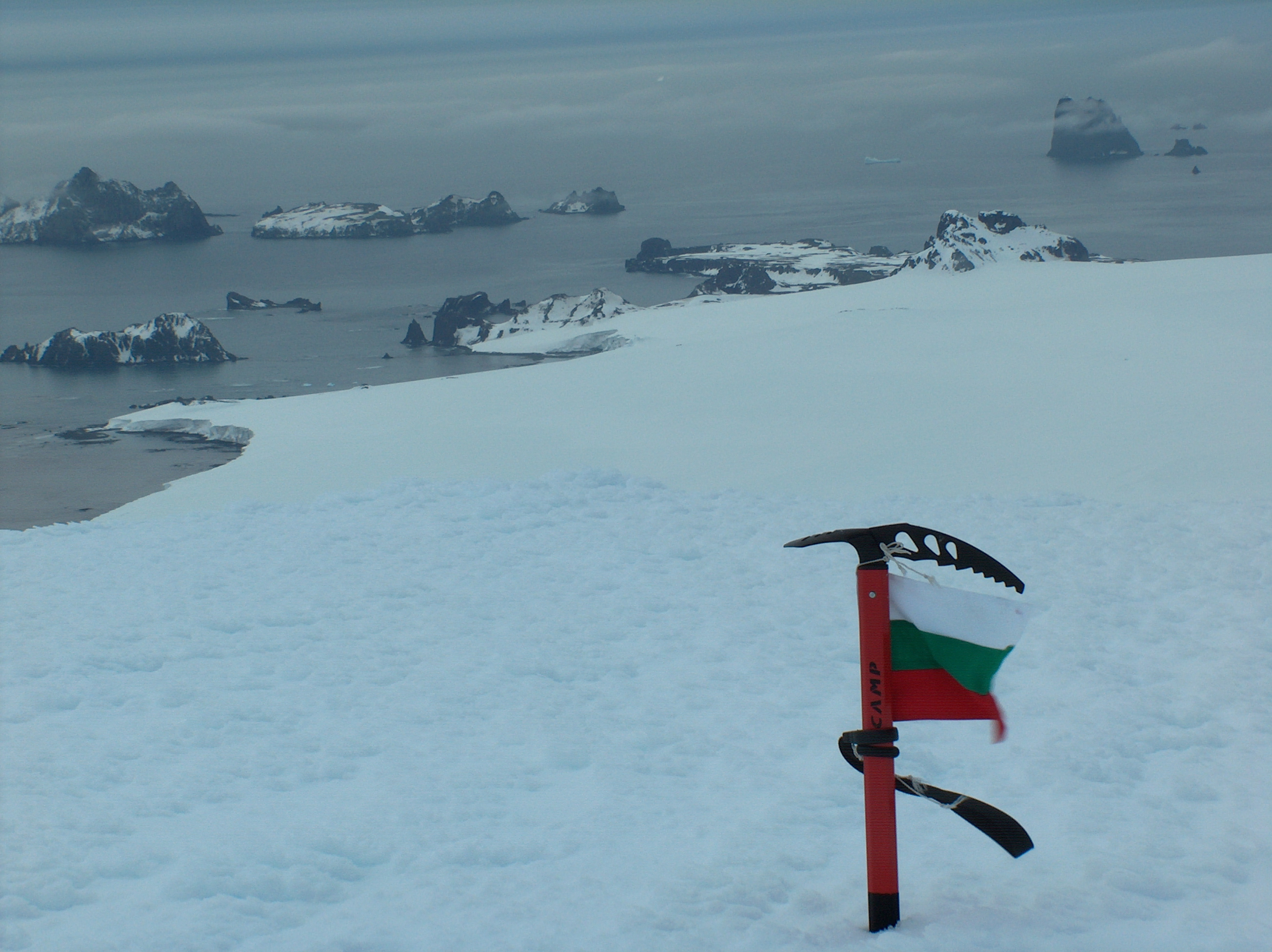
Williams Point on Livingston Island, the land discovered by William Smith on 19 February 1819.

Smith's and other early voyages in the Southern Ocean

William Smith (c. 1790–1847) was an English captain born in Blyth, Northumberland, who discovered the South Shetland Islands, an archipelago off the Graham Land in Antarctica. His discovery was the first ever made south of 60° south latitude, in the present Antarctic Treaty area.

== Early life and Apprenticeship ==
Earsdon Parish Records held at Woodhorn Museum show that William, eldest son of William and Mary Smith, was baptised at St. Cuthbert's Church on 10 October 1790. Smith had a younger brother, Thomas, and sister, Mary, and his father was a Joiner of Seaton Sluice.

In the eighteenth century, boys would start their seven-year apprenticeship at sea at the age of fourteen. According to John Miers' account of the discovery, William Smith had undertaken his apprenticeship ‘in the Greenland whale-fishery’. (At that time, there was a substantial British whaling industry, including to Greenland.) During his life he worked with Richard Siddins, described by historian Ida Lee as "...perhaps the greatest traveler of them all, who gave so much information concerning early Fiji, and delighted to hold mission services on board his ship in Sydney Harbour."

By 1811 Smith became part owner of the ship William, which was then under construction in Blyth, Northumberland.

== Supposed discovery of Antarctica ==
In 1819, while sailing cargo on William from Buenos Aires to Valparaíso, he sailed further south round Cape Horn in an attempt to catch the right winds. On 19 February 1819 he spotted the new land at 62° south latitude and 60° west longitude, but did not land on it (based on those coordinates, it was most likely Livingston Island.) The naval authorities did not believe his discovery, but on a subsequent trip on 16 October he landed on the largest of the islands. He named the island King George Island and the archipelago South Shetland Islands in honour of the Shetland Islands which are to the north of Scotland. At the beginning of the following year, 1820, the Royal Navy chartered William and dispatched with her with Lieutenant Edward Bransfield on board to survey the newly discovered islands, discovering also the Antarctic Peninsula in the process. The first one to land and not only see the continental part of Antarctica may have been Andrew MacFarlane, a Scottish to the service of Chile in October 1820, as well as the American John Davis in February 1821.

== Honours ==
Smith Island and Cape Smith in the South Shetland Islands, Antarctica are named after William Smith.

== See also ==
- Livingston Island

== Sources ==
- Antarctic Voyages and Expeditions, retrieved on 2 March 2005
- Glasgow Digital Library: Scotland and the Antarctic: Nineteenth Century, retrieved on 2 March 2005
- Ashgate Publishing: The Discovery of the South Shetland Islands, 1819-1820: The Journal of Midshipman C. W. Poynter, summary of the book retrieved on 2 March 2005
- Ivanov, L. General Geography and History of Livingston Island. In: Bulgarian Antarctic Research: A Synthesis. Eds. C. Pimpirev and N. Chipev. Sofia: St. Kliment Ohridski University Press, 2015. pp. 17–28. ISBN 978-954-07-3939-7
