= Kittatinny =

Kittatinny may refer to:

== Places ==
In New Jersey

- Kittatinny Formation, a dolomitic limestone formation
- Kittatinny Mountain, a long ridge traversing northwestern New Jersey
- Kittatinny Regional High School, in Sussex County
- Kittatinny Valley, lying east of the Kittatinny Mountain in western Sussex County
- Kittatinny Valley State Park, near Andover

In Pennsylvania

- Kittatinny Mountain Tunnel, part of the Pennsylvania Turnpike

== Other ==
- USS Kittatinny (1861), a schooner acquired by the Union Navy during the American Civil War
