= Edward Bransfield =

Irish sailor (1785–1852)

- Born: c. 1785; Ballinacurra, County Cork, Kingdom of Ireland
- Died: 31 October 1852 (aged 66–67); Brighton, England
- Military career
- Branch: Royal Navy
- Service years: 1803–1820
- Rank: Master
- Conflicts: Bombardment of Algiers

Edward Bransfield (c. 1785 – 31 October 1852) was a Royal Navy officer who served as a master on several ships, after being impressed into service in Ireland at the age of 18. He is noted for his participation in several explorations of parts of Antarctica, including a sighting of the Trinity Peninsula in January 1820.

== Early life ==
Edward Bransfield was born in Ballinacurra, County Cork c. 1785. While little is known of Edward's family or early life, the Bransfields are thought to have been a well-known and respected Catholic family. They may have had enough money to pay for Edward's education, but because of the Penal Laws, it is more likely that he attended a local hedge school. On 2 June 1803, Bransfield, then eighteen years old, was removed by a press-gang from his father's fishing boat and impressed into the Royal Navy.

He began as an ordinary seaman on the 110-gun first-rate ship of the line HMS Ville de Paris, where he shared living quarters with William Edward Parry, then a twelve-year-old midshipman; Parry later also became known in polar exploration. Bransfield was rated as an able seaman in 1805 and was appointed to the 110-gun first-rate HMS Royal Sovereign (which had taken part in the Battle of Trafalgar); he was promoted in 1806 to able seaman, then 2nd master's mate in 1808, midshipman in 1808, clerk in 1809, and midshipman again in 1811. By 1812, he had achieved the rank of second master, and in the same year he was made acting master on HMS Goldfinch, a 10-gun Cherokee-class brig-sloop.

Between the years 1814 and 1816, Bransfield served briefly as master on many fifth-rate ships. On 21 February 1816, he was appointed master of the 50-gun fourth-rate HMS Severn, leading it in the Bombardment of Algiers. During September 1817, he was appointed master of HMS Andromache under the command of Captain W. H. Shirreff. It was during this tour of duty that he was posted to the Royal Navy's new Pacific Squadron off Valparaíso in Chile.

== Antarctic exploration ==
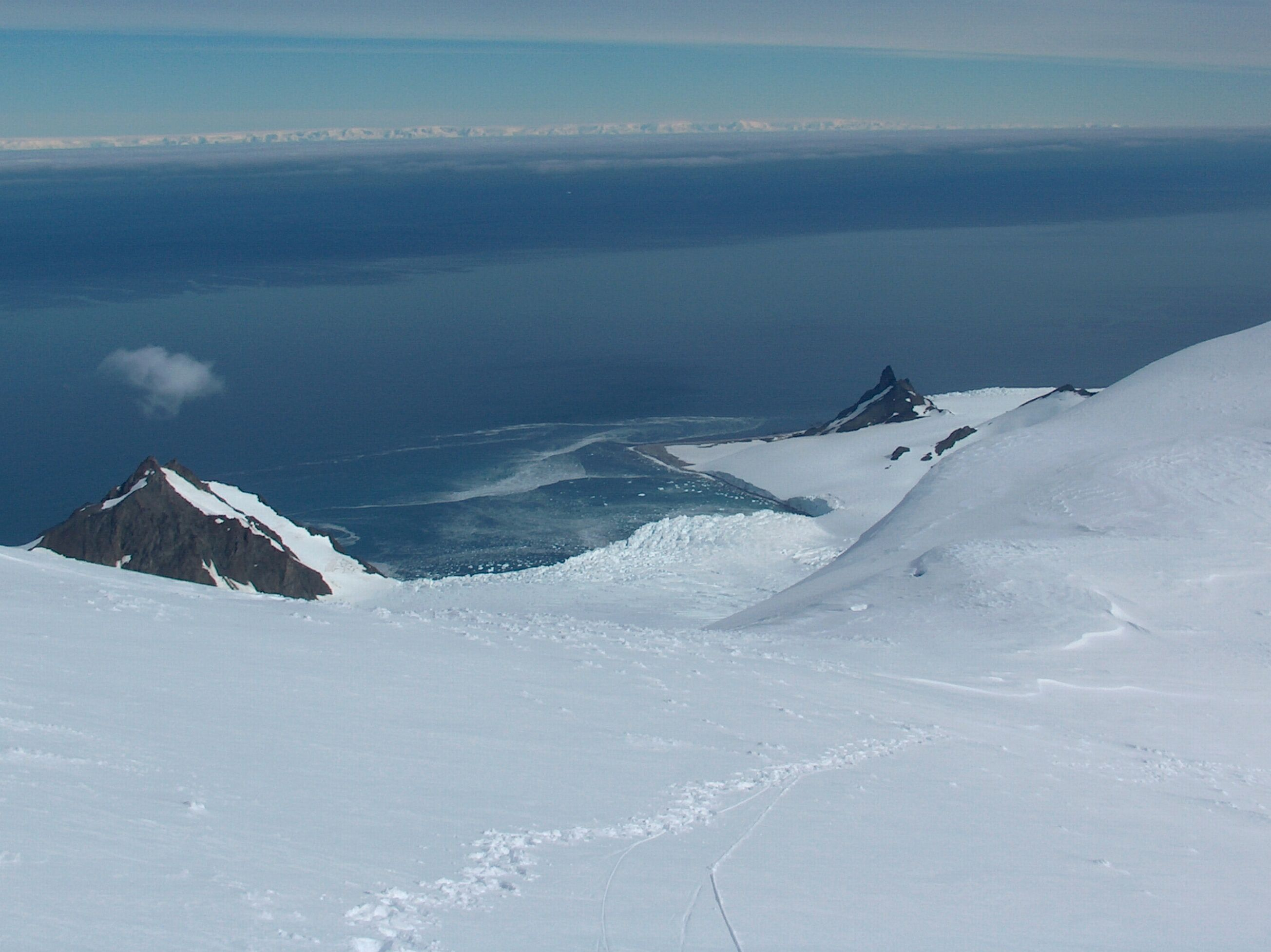
The Bransfield Strait from the Tangra Mountains on Livingston Island, in the South Shetland Islands; the Antarctic Peninsula is in the background

During 1773, James Cook sailed beyond the Antarctic Circle, noting with pride in his journal that he was "undoubtedly the first that ever crossed that line." The next year, Cook circumnavigated Antarctica completely and reached a latitude of 71°10'S before being driven back by the ice. Although Cook failed to see Antarctica, he dispelled once and for all the myth that a fertile, populous continent surrounded the South Pole. The Admiralty lost interest in the Antarctic and turned its attention to the ongoing search for the Northwest Passage. Almost half a century passed before anyone else is known to have travelled as far south as Cook.

In February 1819, while rounding Cape Horn, William Smith, the owner and skipper of the English merchant ship William, was driven south by adverse winds and discovered what came to be known as the South Shetland Islands. When news of his discovery reached Valparaíso, Captain Shirreff of the Royal Navy decided that the matter warranted further investigation. He chartered William and appointed Bransfield, two midshipmen, and the surgeon from the ship HMS Slaney to survey the newly discovered islands. Smith remained aboard, acting as Bransfield's pilot.

After a brief and uneventful voyage into the Southern Ocean, Bransfield and Smith reached the South Shetland Islands. Bransfield landed on King George Island and took formal possession on behalf of King George III (who had died the day before, on 29 January 1820). He then proceeded in a southwesterly direction past Deception Island, not investigating or charting it. Turning south, he crossed what is now known as the Bransfield Strait (named for him by James Weddell in 1822), and on 30 January 1820 sighted Trinity Peninsula, the northernmost point of the Antarctic mainland. "Such was the discovery of Antarctica," writes the English writer Roland Huntford. Bransfield made a note in his log of two "high mountains, covered with snow", one of which was subsequently named Mount Bransfield by Jules Dumont d'Urville in his honour.

Unknown to Bransfield, two days earlier, on 28 January 1820, Russian explorer Fabian Gottlieb von Bellingshausen may have caught sight of an icy shoreline now known to be part of East Antarctica. On the basis of this sighting and the coordinates given in his logbook, Bellingshausen has been credited by some (e.g., British polar historian A. G. E. Jones) with the discovery of the continent.

The first one to land and not only see the continental part of Antarctica may have been Andrew MacFarlane, a Scottish to the service of Chile in October 1820, as well as the American John Davis in February 1821.

Having charted a segment of the Trinity Peninsula, Bransfield followed the edge of the Antarctic ice sheet in a northeasterly direction and discovered various points on Elephant Island and Clarence Island, which he also formally claimed for the British Crown. He did not sail around Elephant Island and did not name it, although he charted Clarence Island completely.

When Bransfield returned to Valparaíso, he gave his charts and journal to Captain Shirreff, who delivered them to the Admiralty. The original charts are still in the possession of the hydrographic department in Taunton, Somerset, but Bransfield's journal has been lost. The Admiralty, it seems, was still more interested in the search for the Northwest Passage. Two private accounts of Bransfield's historic voyage were published during 1821. During recent years the journal of one of the midshipmen, Charles Poynter, was discovered in New Zealand. An account has been published by the Hakluyt Society, edited by Richard Campbell, RN.

== Later life ==
The remainder of Bransfield's life is obscure. He died on 31 October 1852 at the age of 66 or 67, and was buried in the Brighton Extra-Mural Cemetery in southern England. His wife survived him and was buried in the same grave after her death in 1863.

== Legacy and honors ==
Bransfield Island, Bransfield Strait, Bransfield Trough, Bransfield Rocks, and Mount Bransfield were all named in his honour.

In 1999, Edward Bransfield's grave, discovered in a deteriorated state in a Brighton churchyard, was renovated (funded by charitable donations) by Sheila Bransfield. In 2002, she completed a master's thesis on his role in the discovery of Antarctica at the Greenwich Maritime Institute. The event was marked by a ceremony attended by numerous dignitaries.

In 2000, the Royal Mail issued a commemorative stamp in Bransfield's honour, but as no likeness of him could be found, the stamp depicted instead RRS Bransfield, an Antarctic surveying vessel named after him.

In January 2020, on the 200th anniversary of his discovery of Antarctica, a commemorative monument was unveiled in his hometown of Ballinacurra, in County Cork, Ireland. On the same day a blue plaque was unveiled at his former home at 11 Clifton Road, Brighton.

== See also ==
- Nathaniel Palmer, the first American to see Antarctica, on 17 November 1820
- Fabian Gottlieb von Bellingshausen
- Andrew MacFarlane, possibly the fist to land in continental Antarctica on October 1820.
- History of Antarctica
- Livingston Island
