= Anna Shchetinina =

Soviet sea captain (1908–1999)

Anna Ivanovna Shchetinina
- Анна Ивановна Щетинина
- Born: 26 February 1908; Okeanskaya Station, Primorskaya Oblast, Russian Empire
- Died: 25 September 1999 (aged 91); Vladivostok, Russian Federation
- Occupation: Ship captain
- Awards: Hero of Socialist Labour

Anna Ivanovna Shchetinina (Russian: Анна Ивановна Щетинина; 26 February 1908 – 25 September 1999) was a Soviet merchant marine sailor who became the world's first woman to serve as a captain of an ocean-going vessel.

Shchetinina was born at the Okeanskaya Station near Vladivostok in a family of a railway switchman. In 1925 she entered the navigation department of the Vladivostok Marine School (Russian: Владивостокский морской техникум). After graduation she worked with a shipping company in Kamchatka Peninsula, where she started as an Ordinary Seaman (or, rather, "Seawoman"), and rose to a captain. At the age of 24 she received her navigator's license (qualifying her for a position equivalent to a Second Mate in the Western merchant marines), and at 27 became the world's first female captain of an ocean-going ship. She attracted international attention on her first voyage as a captain (in 1935), as a young woman in charge of MV Chavycha on its journey from Hamburg (where it had just been purchased) to the Russian Far East around Europe, Africa, and Asia.

On 20 March 1938 Shchetinina became the first chief manager of the Vladivostok fishing port. Later the same year, however, she went back to school, now at Leningrad Ship Transport Institute.

She participated in World War II in the Baltic, where her ship was evacuating people from Tallinn and transporting war cargoes under enemy bombardment. Later during the war she was the master of a Liberty ship moving Lend-Lease supplies across the Pacific from the USA to Soviet Far Eastern ports.

After the War Ms. Shchetinina served as the captain of MV Askold, Baskunchak, Beloostrov, Dniester, Pskov, and Mendeleev of the Soviet Baltic Shipping Company. Since in 1949 she taught in the Leningrad Marine Engineering College (Ленинградское высшее инженерно-морское училище); in 1951 she became a senior instructor there, and later, the Dean of the Institute's Navigation Department. In 1956 she was granted the title of docent. In 1960 she accepted the position of a docent (associate professor) at the Department of Sea Craft" (Морское дело) at Vladivostok Marine Engineering and Navigation College.

Anna Ivanovna Shchetinina was awarded the medal of the Hero of Socialist Labor, which was one of the two highest awards of the USSR. She was also honored as a Distinguished Worker of the Merchant Marine an honorary citizen of Vladivostok, an honorary member of the Far-Eastern Association of Shipmasters and The International Federation of Shipmasters' Associations (IFSMA), and received a number of other national and international awards.

She published a book entitled On the Seas and Beyond the Seas (Russian: На морях и за морями), and was admitted as a member into the Union of Russian Writers.

A monument in honor of Shchetinina has been erected in the old Maritime Cemetery in Vladivostok. On 20 October 2006 Cape Shchetinina on the shore of the Amur Bay of the Sea of Japan was named in her honor. On 8 February 2017, one of five previously unnamed Kuril Islands in Sakhalin Oblast was named after her, as Shchetinina Island.

== See also ==
- Mary Parker Converse
