= Andrew MacFarlane (sailor) =

Scottish-born sea captain and Chilean naval officer

- Born: c. 1779 (Note: No source consulted records his date of birth. Sources state that in 1819 he was a captain "of about forty" and that in 1820 he "must have been somewhat over 40", which would place his birth around 1779. This year is only an estimate derived from an approximate age and is not documented.); Scotland
- Died: Unknown; Valparaíso, Chile
- Other names: Andrés MacFarlane, Andrew McFarlane
- Occupations: Merchant captain, naval officer, sealer, merchant
- Known for: Voyage of the Dragón de Valparaíso to the South Shetland Islands (1820–21); possible first landing on the Antarctic mainland
- Spouse: Ana Campbell
- Children: Roberto Carlos MacFarlane

Andrew MacFarlane (also Andrés MacFarlane or McFarlane; born circa 1779) was a Scottish merchant captain, officer of the Chilean Navy and merchant in Valparaíso who in 1820 commanded the brig Dragón de Valparaíso on a sealing voyage to the South Shetland Islands. According to the British sealer Robert Fildes, MacFarlane told him that he had landed on the land south of Deception Island. Several historians regard this as possibly the first recorded landing on the Antarctic continent.

== Early life and arrival in Chile ==
According to the will of his son Roberto Carlos, made in Valparaíso in 1861 and held in the city's notarial archive, Andrés MacFarlane and his wife, Ana Campbell, were "natives of Scotland". The historian Jorge Guzmán considers it "highly probable" that he emigrated to South America to take part in the wars of independence, like many officers and seamen of the Royal Navy demobilised after the Napoleonic Wars and the War of 1812. Guzmán adds that he may well have been recruited in England by the Chilean envoy José Antonio Álvarez Condarco. An experienced captain of about forty, he arrived at Valparaíso on 17 July 1819 in command of the Anna Robinson, from Liverpool, carrying goods from England and India and a cargo of arms for the Liberation Army.

For decades, English-speaking historians who mentioned the "Captain Macfarlane" of Fildes's journal did not know his first name and assumed he was either American or English. His son's will enabled Guzmán to identify him as the Andrés MacFarlane who settled in Valparaíso. The son, Robert Charles or Roberto Carlos MacFarlane, was around 1820 a young farmer of about twenty who managed properties belonging to Lord Cochrane, in particular his hacienda at Quintero. Some authors confused father and son, because Chilean historians such as Vicuña Mackenna and Roberto Hernández mention Roberto but not Andrés.

== Naval service ==
Almost immediately after arriving, MacFarlane gave up command of the Anna Robinson to join the naval squadron being organised by Thomas Cochrane. The ship's owners complained to Captain William H. Shirreff, commander of the British naval station in the Pacific, according to documents in the Shirreff Collection at the National Maritime Museum, Greenwich. Despite their complaint, and probably through Cochrane's intervention, he was appointed a lieutenant in the Chilean Navy.

In September 1819 he requested his discharge from the Minister of War and Navy, José Ignacio Zenteno. Aware of his abilities, Zenteno instructed the governor of Valparaíso, Luis de la Cruz, to give him a task first. He was to sail in the brig Intrépido to Talcahuano, take command of the schooner Montezuma (then the fastest ship in the fleet) and bring her to Valparaíso for the preparations for the assault on Valdivia. First Lieutenant Guillermo Cronton of the frigate O'Higgins had also volunteered for the mission. MacFarlane, relying on his ties with the governor, argued that he had already established his business in Valparaíso, but in the end he accepted the commission. The matter reached Supreme Director Bernardo O'Higgins, who on 24 December 1819 ordered in his own hand that the discharge be granted, since "although MacFarlane has long held a commission as Lieutenant of the Navy, he may leave the service after bringing the Montezuma". He remained in service until January 1820. On 19 January the governor reported that he had sailed for Callao in the English frigate Hércules. In a later text, Guzmán states that MacFarlane took part in the Capture of Valdivia in command of the Montezuma.

== Merchant in Valparaíso ==
After leaving the navy, MacFarlane went into trade and ship provisioning in Valparaíso. According to the memoirs of Lieutenant Richard Longeville Vowell, the partnership of the "Englishmen MacFarlane and Pott" had premises in the port "that were the admiration of all Chileans"; his partner was William Potts, a former petty officer of the squadron. In mid-1820, back from Callao, he took command of the Dragón.

== The Dragón ==
The Dragon of Liverpool, probably built in France and taken by an English privateer around 1814, was a single-decked, two-masted brig of about 167 tons. She is first recorded in Chile in January 1818, when she reached Valparaíso with arms and gunpowder consigned to Ricardo Price and Juan Diego Barnard, later used at the Battle of Maipú. A few days later, a fire caused by gunpowder residue in her ballast burned part of her deck and injured her master, Juan Catlin, and two crewmen. According to A. G. E. Jones, in mid-1819 her owner, William Brade, sold her to a group of Valparaíso merchants before Captain Shirreff of HMS Andromache. The buyers are not known; Guzmán considers it likely that MacFarlane and Catlin were among them. Before MacFarlane, she had been commanded in Chile by James (Jaime) Brown and Juan Catlin. She traded between Valparaíso, Montevideo, Buenos Aires and the northern coast of Chile, carrying grain among other goods. Registered at Valparaíso, she was renamed Dragón de Valparaíso and sailed under the Chilean flag.

== Voyage to the South Shetlands (1820–21) ==
Voyage of the Dragon de Valparaiso (1820–1821) Andrew MacFarlane, possible first landing on the Antarctic mainland.

In March 1820 the brig Williams, with which Edward Bransfield had charted the South Shetlands discovered the previous year by William Smith, returned to Valparaíso with news that their beaches teemed with fur seals. Several merchants of the port then fitted out sealing voyages, and the new owners of the Dragón gave the command to MacFarlane. According to the Chilean Antarctic Institute, Supreme Director O'Higgins authorised the voyage. The archival sources cited by Guzmán, however, document O'Higgins's involvement in MacFarlane's discharge. The ship sailed south on 12 September 1820 and, after five or six weeks, sighted the South Shetlands around mid-October.

On 14-16 December 1820 according to Guzmán, Robert Fildes, master of the brig Cora, recorded that "a whaleboat belonging to the brig Dragon of Liverpool, lately of Valparaíso, came alongside". She "had been seven weeks on the coast and had obtained 5,000 seal skins". Fildes's log and journal, covering 6 October 1820 to 13 January 1821, is held at The National Archives. His Remarks Made During a Voyage to New South Shetland are held at the Scott Polar Research Institute.

In another passage, describing the snow-covered, mountainous land visible to the south of Deception Island, Fildes wrote that "Captain MacFarlane of the brig Dragon, a very intelligent man, told me he had landed there and had found leopard and elephant seals, but no fur seals". According to a later text by Guzmán, this remark relates to a second meeting in February 1821, off the north coast of Livingston Island. MacFarlane also mentioned "good beaches" with many leopard seals, and said the brig Caraquette of Liverpool had found a cove and anchorage there. The landing would have taken place on the western side of the Antarctic Peninsula, between mid-October and early December 1820. Based on Fildes's own chart of Deception Island, Guzmán argues that the coast in question is today's Davis Coast.

The Dragón remained in the area until the end of the 1820–21 summer. She then sold most of her skins in Buenos Aires and sailed for England, where her arrival was recorded on 11 April 1821 as coming from "New South Shetland". She later returned to trade on the Pacific coast of South America.

== Priority debate ==
If accepted, this would be the first recorded landing on the Antarctic continent. British historiography has traditionally credited the American John Davis, whose landing of 7 February 1821 is well documented. American historiography credits Nathaniel Palmer, who sighted the peninsula on 18 November 1820, when the Dragón was already in the area, but did not land. The landing of Captain Joseph Usher of the Caraquette cannot have taken place before December 1821. According to Guzmán, the American historian Kenneth J. Bertrand acknowledges that only MacFarlane could have preceded Palmer in discovering Deception Island. Headland describes MacFarlane's landing as "possibly the first such landing", but also refers to the claim of Christopher Burdick (1820–22). It is not known whether MacFarlane was aware of the significance of his landing or left any written account of it.

== Later life ==
MacFarlane joined the community of British and American merchants in Valparaíso. With his son Roberto he was involved in the firms MacFarlane & Green y Cía. and Roberto MacFarlane y Cía., according to court records in Valparaíso from the 1820s to the 1860s. Guzmán describes this firm as one of the most important in the south-east Pacific in the 19th century. His descendants still live in the city. The date and place of his death are unknown.

== Legacy ==
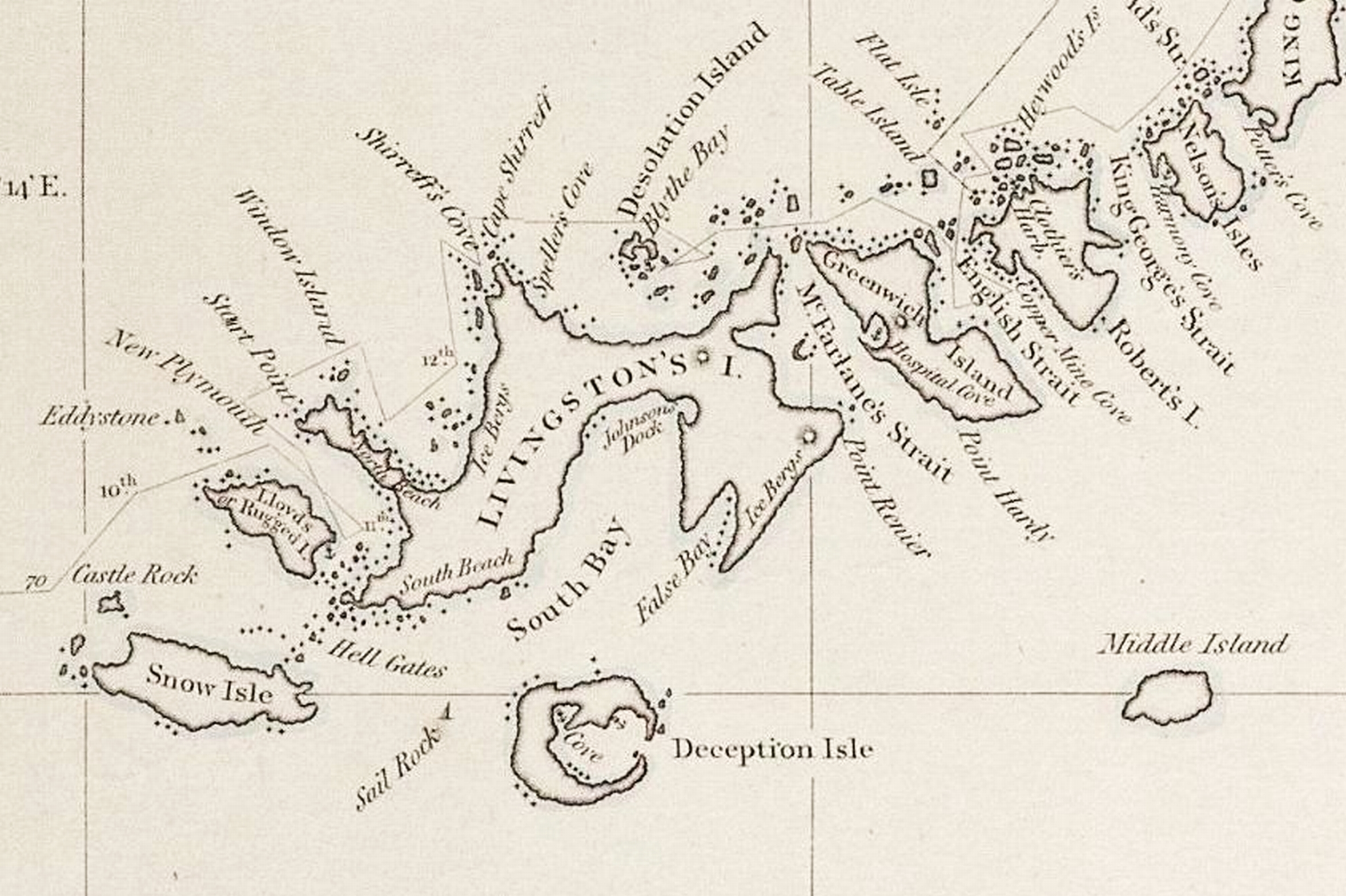
George Powell 1822 map, featuring MacFarlane Strait.

- McFarlane Strait, between Greenwich and Livingston islands, is named after him. It was named by the sealer George Powell, whose chart of the South Shetlands, published in 1822, also drew on information from other captains, possibly including MacFarlane himself. William James Mills associates the name with MacFarlane, while noting that Nathaniel Palmer explored the strait in November 1820.
- Dragon Cove on Livingston Island is named after his ship.
- A commemorative plaque at Yankee Harbour, Greenwich Island, near a Chilean refuge, was "erected to the memory of Captain Andrew MacFarlane, who in 1820 explored the Antarctic Peninsula area in the brigantine Dragon". Proposed by Chile and the United Kingdom, it is Antarctic Historic Site and Monument No. 57. The original inscription misidentified him as "Robert", confusing him with his son.
- For the bicentenary, INACH published the children's comic Las aventuras de Isa y Miguel: el Dragón de Valparaíso descubre la Antártica (2020), by Alfredo Rodríguez and Gonzalo Martínez (ISBN 978-956-7046-19-5).

== Bibliography ==
- Headland, R. K. (1989). Chronological List of Antarctic Expeditions and Related Historical Events. Cambridge: Cambridge University Press. ISBN 978-0-521-30903-5.
- Guzmán Gutiérrez, Jorge (2003). El capitán Andrés Mac Farlane y el Dragón: Valparaíso y el descubrimiento de la Antártica, 1819-1823 [Captain Andrés Mac Farlane and the Dragón: Valparaíso and the discovery of Antarctica, 1819–1823] (MA thesis) (in Spanish). Santiago: Universidad de Chile, Departamento de Ciencias Históricas. p. 131. Supervisor: Eduardo Cavieres Figueroa.
