= Honourable Company of Master Mariners =

Livery company of the City of London

Coordinates: 51°30′38″N 0°6′45″W

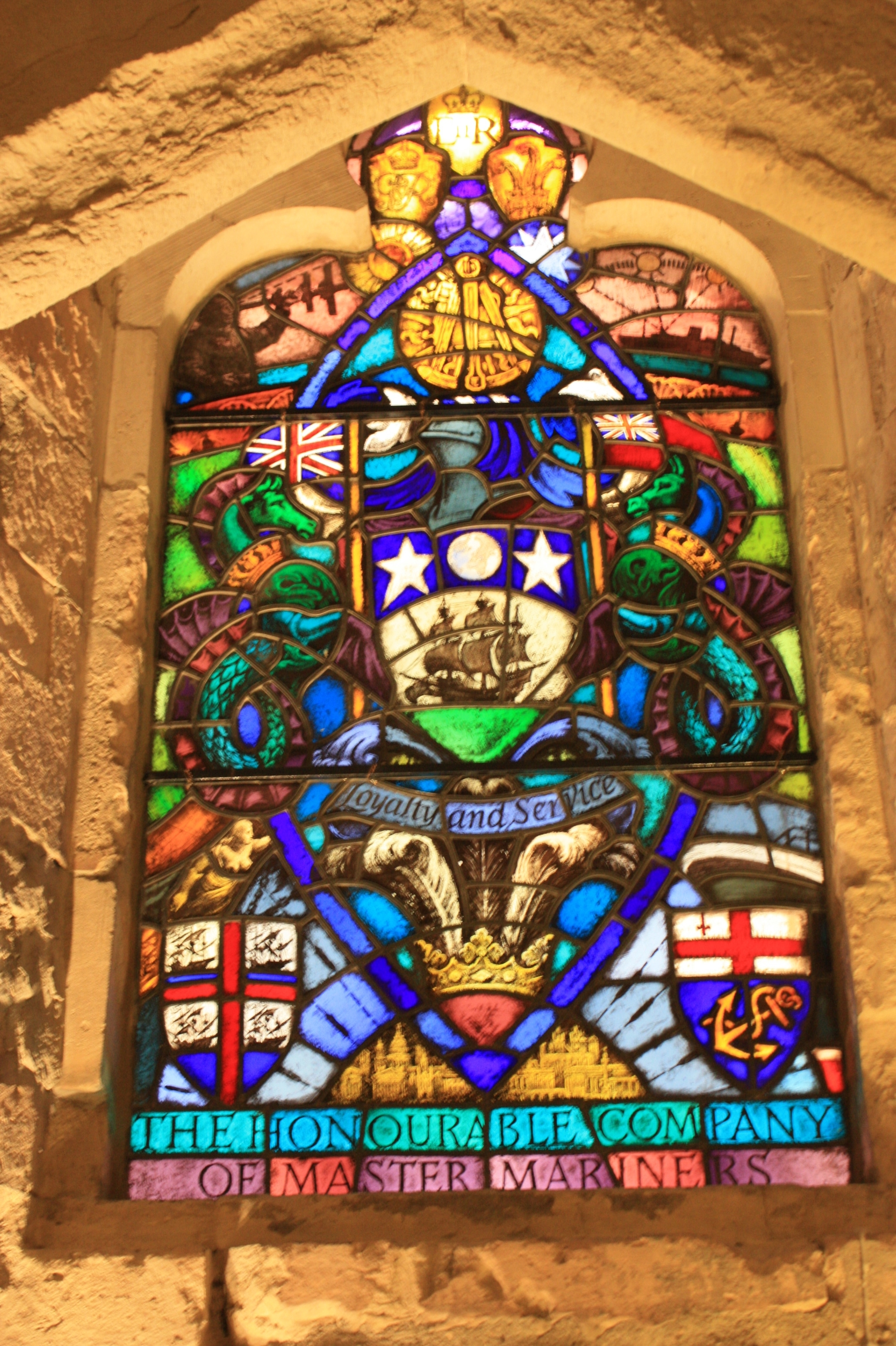
Stained glass to the Honourable Company of Master Mariners, Guildhall, London

The Honourable Company of Master Mariners is one of the livery companies of the City of London. While the other livery companies are entitled to the style Worshipful, the Master Mariners are styled Honourable, King George V having granted them that honour in 1928.

The Company aids nautical schools and promotes nautical research. Members meet regularly to socialise, discuss technical issues and assist with the mentoring and training of young officers, who will train at sea to reach master mariner status.

The Honourable Company ranks seventy-eighth in the order of precedence for livery companies. Its motto is Loyalty and Service. The organisation nominally has the right to allow two of its Masters to serve as nautical assessors in the Admiralty Court.

The company works with other industry organisations such as the International Federation of Shipmasters' Associations. This includes the organisations of lectures and command seminars.

== History ==
The company was formed and incorporated in 1926. In February 1928, Edward, Prince of Wales was elected Master of the company. The company was made an official Livery Company by the City of London in 1932, making it the first new Livery Company to be formed since 1746.

In February 1952 Queen Elizabeth II became royal patron of the company. In June 1954, Prince Philip, Duke of Edinburgh was made a Master of the company.

Between 1988 and 1990, Charles, Prince of Wales was Master of the company. From 2005 to 2007, Anne, Princess Royal served as Master of the company. Prince Edward, Duke of Edinburgh was appointed Master in 2025.

== Clerks ==
- 1926–1959: W. T. C. Smith Esq
- 1959–1967: M. H. Disney Esq
- 1968–1991: D. H. W. Field Esq
- 1991–2002: J. A. V. Maddock Esq
- 2002–2005: Cdr I. S. Gregory RN
- 2005–2008: Cdr R. W. W. Craig RN
- 2009–2020: Cdre A. Menzies RN
- 2020–2025: S. Hanlon
- 2025–present: M. Jenkins

== HQS Wellington ==
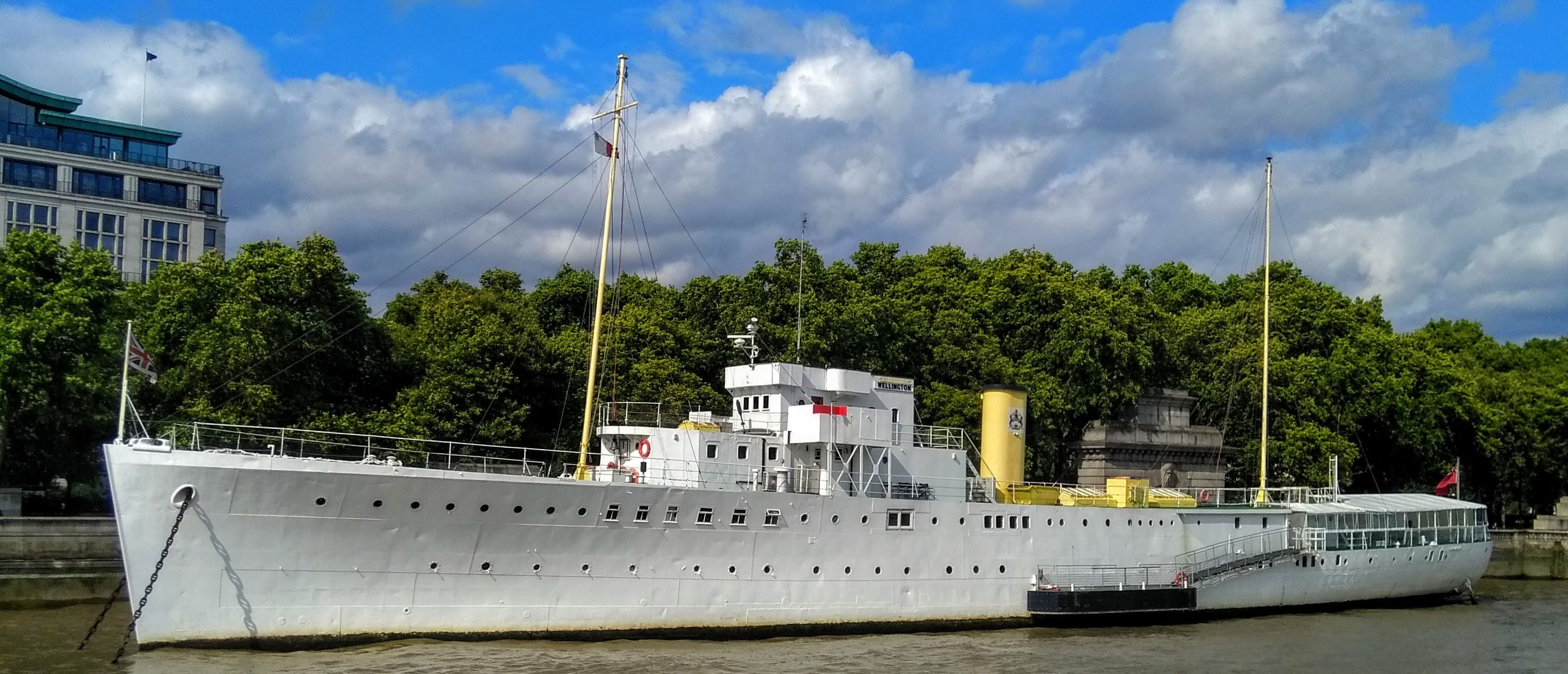
HQS Wellington

Between 1948 and 2023, instead of the usual livery hall, the Honourable Company of Master Mariners had a headquarters ship, HQS Wellington, moored on the Thames at Victoria Embankment. The Company purchased the Grimsby-class sloop from the Admiralty in 1947 following donations from their members. She was subsequently converted for use as a floating livery hall in Chatham Dockyard. The conversion was paid for by donations from Lloyd's of London, private benefactors, shipping companies and other livery companies. In December 1948, the ship was moved to her permanent mooring along the Victoria Embankment. In 1991, the ship was extensively refurbished following a period of dry-docking in the private yards at Sheerness Dockyard.

In July 2005, ownership of HQS Wellington was transferred from the Honourable Company to a new organisation, the Wellington Trust, although the company retained its home onboard and was largely responsible for leadership within the trust. On 6 April 2023, it was announced that, due to safety concerns, the Honourable Company would leave the ship, though they were developing plans for a new floating livery hall.

On display on the ship was the steering wheel of the ship Otago, the Master Joseph Conrad having sailed on the Otago. Following her destruction in 1931, the wheel was presented to the Honourable Company.

== Coat of arms ==
Coat of arms of Honourable Company of Master Mariners
Crest On a wreath of the colours, In front of a sun in splendour proper a quadrant Or. Escutcheon Argent, on waves of the sea a representation of the ship 4 The Golden Hind' in full sail all proper; on a chief arched azure a terrestrial globe also proper between two mullets of the field. Supporters On either side a sea horse proper gorged with a naval crown Or, that on the dexter supporting a staff proper headed Or, flying therefrom the Union Flag, and that on the sinister supporting a like staff, flying therefrom the Red Ensign also proper. Motto 'Loyalty and Service'
