= William (1811 Blythe ship) =

UK merchant ship (1811–1829)

History

United Kingdom
- Name: William
- Launched: 1811, Blyth, Northumberland
- Fate: Last listed in 1829

General characteristics
- Tons burthen: 215, or 216 (bm)
- Armament: 1813:6 × 6-pounder carronades; 1814:6 × 6-pounder guns

William (or Williams) was launched at Blyth in 1811. In 1818, a letter of marque captured her, but she was then released. In October 1819, she fortuitously discovered the South Shetland Islands while on a voyage from Buenos Aires to Valparaíso. She was last listed in 1829.

== Career ==
In 1811, William Smith became part owner of William; she first appeared in Lloyd's Register (LR) in 1811.

Year	Master	Owner	Trade	Source
1813	W.Smith	W.Stand	London–Lisbon	LR
1815	W.Smith	W.Strand	London–Bordeaux; London–Brazils	LR
1816	W.Smith	W.Strand	London–Buenos Aires	LR
1818	W.Smith; Nicholson	W.Strand	London–Buenos Aires; London–Riga	LR
1819	W.Smith	W.Strand	London–Buenos Aires	LR

On 20 November 1817, Williams, Smith, master, of London, was at Bahia. She had been sailing from Buenos Ayres to London when she had encountered the Spanish letter of marque Rita, Atrate, master. The Spanish vessel had been sailing from St Andero and Loango and was on her way to Lima. Rita took Williams into Bahia. (Note: Rita (aka Flor de Mayo), Juan Batista de Arrarte, master, was a slave ship delivering a cargo of slaves to Bahia that she had gathered at Loango.) After Williams had landed that part of her cargo "supposed to belong to Buenos Aires", she was permitted to continue her voyage. On 6 May 1818, William arrived at Gravesend from Buenos Ayres and Bahia.

On 2 August 1818, Williams, Smith, master, sailed from Gravesend for Buenos Aires. She arrived there on 22 October. In July 1819, Lloyd's List reported that she had arrived at Valparaíso from Buenos Aires. In February 1819, William, Smith, master, fortuitously discovered the South Shetland Islands whilst sailing from Buenos Aires to Valparaíso.

Smith had been blown off course in Drake Passage and sighted Williams Point, the northeast extremity of Livingston Island, on 19 February 1819. That was the first land ever discovered south of 60° south latitude, in what is now the Antarctic Treaty area.

On reaching Valparaíso, Smith reported his discovery of the islands and the abundance of seals there, to Captain William Henry Shirreff, of HMS Andromache, which had arrived there about 5 September 1818. (Shirreff had been appointed the commanding officer of British naval forces in the Pacific.)

In October 1819, Smith revisited the South Shetlands, landing on King George Island on 16 October. On 24 November, Williams was back at Valparaíso from Monte Video.

Shirreff chartered William to carry a party consisting of Lieutenant Edward Bransfield, three midshipmen, and a ship's surgeon. They arrived in December and surveyed, mapped, and claimed the new lands for Britain. Furthermore, on 30 January 1820, Bransfield sighted Davis Coast on the Antarctic Peninsula. By mid-April William was back at Valparaíso.

On 27 April 1821, Williams, Smith, arrived at Rio de Janeiro from the New South Shetlands. From there, Williams sailed to Lisbon. She sailed from Portsmouth to London on 11 September.

Year	Master	Owner	Trade	Source
1822	W.Smith; A.Jones	W.Smith; Hains & Co.	London–Buenos Ayres; London–Quebec	LR

== Fate ==
William was last listed in 1829.
