= Isaac D. Seyburn =

- Born: March 1824; Wales
- Died: March 6, 1895 (aged 70–71); Patterson, Louisiana
- Military career
- Allegiance: United States
- Branch: United States Navy
- Service years: 1861–1864
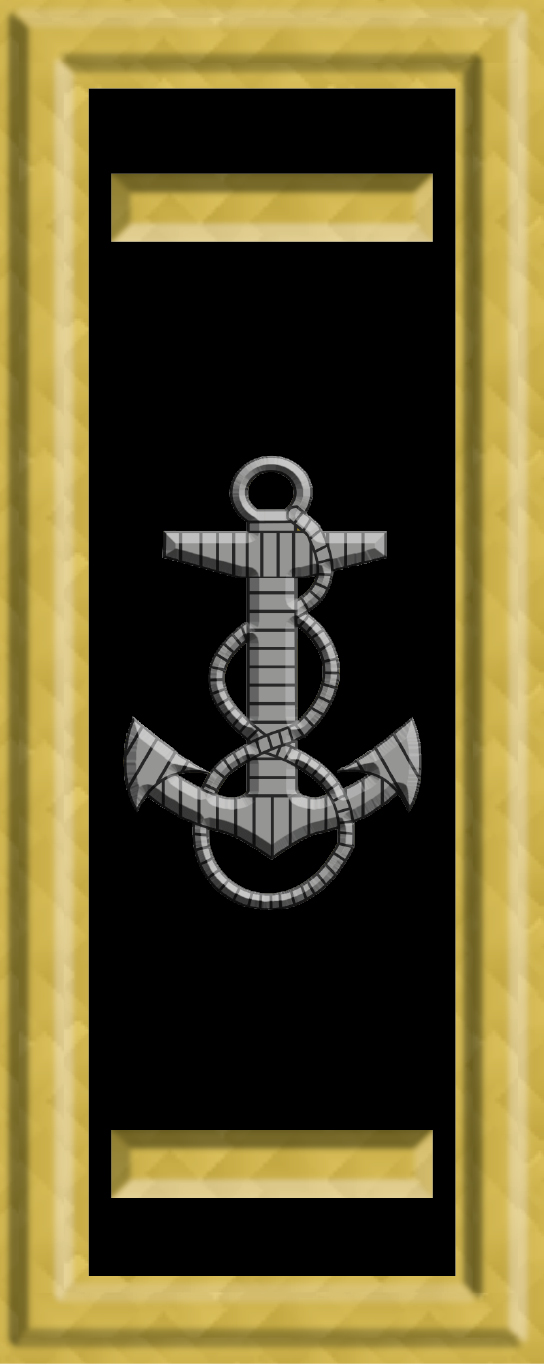
- Rank: Acting-Master
- Commands: USS Kittatinny
- Conflicts: American Civil War
- Other work: Plantation owner

Isaac D. Seyburn (March 1824 – March 6, 1895) was a Welsh-American merchant captain who served as an officer in the United States Navy during the Civil War, with the rank of Acting-Master. He was wounded in action during the 1861 Battle of Port Royal. During 1863 he commanded the schooner Kittatinny as part of the West Gulf Blockading Squadron under Rear Admiral David Farragut. Seyburn resigned his commission in 1864 due to war injuries and initially settled in Maine. He later moved to Louisiana, where he operated a sugar plantation.

== Background and personal life ==
Isaac D. Seyburn was born in Wales in March 1824. He was 5 ft 6 in (1.68 m), 135 lb (61 kg). had blue eyes and dark hair. By profession, he was a "Master Mariner."

On March 15, 1848, he was married in Pittston, Maine, to Mary Ann Rogers who was born in New York City on November 20, 1828. She was a daughter of John Rogers (1800–1863) and Elizabeth Carroll Reynolds (1806–1871). Elizabeth C. Reynolds' family is descended from Christopher Reynolds who settled in what is now Isle of Wight County, Virginia (on the south shore of the James River about 10 miles (16 km) west of Newport News), before 1630 and received a land grant of 450 acres (1.8 km^{2}) in 1636. Her grandfather, Bernard Reynolds (1763–1833), served in the Continental Army during the American Revolutionary War.

Isaac and Mary Ann Seyburn had five children, Emily Williamson Seyburn (1853–1934), Mary Catharine Seyburn (1854–1893), Stephen Young Seyburn (1856–1923), Edward Isaac Seyburn (1860–1931) and John Rogers Seyburn (1867–1905), who were all born in Maine.

== Seafaring career ==
In 1854, Seyburn acquired a brig, a two-masted, square-rigged merchant ship of about 116 feet (35 m) that he named the Emily W. Seyburn after his first child who had been born the year before. The brig was registered in Pittston, Maine. There are records of its periodic arrival in New York between 1854 and 1860 carrying cargo under charter, e.g., coal from Newcastle upon Tyne in England, flour from New Orleans, nickel and hides from Montevideo in Uruguay. By 1857, the brig was either sold or another Master was hired to sail her because records indicate that Seyburn thereafter was Master of the ship Stephen J. Young (1856–1857), and Master of the ship Lew Chew (1857–1861). Stephen J. Young was the son of Stephen Young, the ship's owner; he was also the owner of the Lew Chew; Seyburn's eldest son was named after him.

== Civil War naval service ==
On August 29, 1861, Isaac D. Seyburn volunteered for service in the United States Navy and was awarded a temporary commission as an Acting Master, a volunteer officer whose term of service was until the end of the Civil War. The naval rank of "Master" was later replaced by that of "Lieutenant (junior grade)." He reported for service in New York on September 10, 1861.

Seyburn was seriously wounded in action aboard the steam sloop of war Mohican during the Battle of Port Royal on November 7, 1861. The battle was a major Union victory and up until then the largest naval and amphibious force ever assembled by the United States. Seyburn was wounded when a 32-pound solid minie ball from defending shore batteries shattered the bones of his lower left leg just above the ankle. Seyburn was treated at the Naval Hospital, Brooklyn, New York, between November 14, 1861 and March 1, 1862. He never regained use of the leg, but was confined to crutches and endured pain for the rest of his life.

Despite his injuries, Seyburn continued with his naval service. During his convalescence, he was assigned to the Monitor Board in New York and was a member of the team supervising the construction of the Passaic-class monitor Weehawken in Jersey City, New Jersey. At about the time the Weehawken was launched on November 5, 1862, Seyburn was ordered to the ironclad steamer Galena where he served until the end of her deployment on May 21, 1863, when the ship arrived in Philadelphia for repairs. Galena, commissioned on April 21, 1862, was one of the first three ironclads, each of a different design, built by the U.S. Navy during the Civil War; it was also the second, after the Monitor, to be put under fire.

On June 10, 1863, Seyburn was given command of the Kittatinny, a three-masted fore-and-aft schooner. While under his command, the Kittatinny was assigned to the West Gulf Blockading Squadron under the overall command of Rear-Admiral David Farragut. The ship is credited with having chased an unidentified schooner ashore on September 22, 1863, where that vessel was burned by her crew, and with having captured the three-masted schooner, Reserve, on October 25, 1863, off Pass Cavallo, Texas.

On December 23, 1863, while on deployment off the coast of Texas, Seyburn was ordered to proceed with the Kittatinny to New Orleans. Shortly after his arrival, Seyburn submitted his resignation. In his letter, dated February 18, 1864, from the station ship Portsmouth, Seyburn indicated that he wanted to resign because he had been crippled by his wound and because "the high handed injustice practiced on me by the Commanding officers of the first division of this Squadron is to me insufferable." His resignation was accepted and Seyburn was honorably discharged on March 24, 1864, in Gardiner, Maine.

== Post-war life ==
Following his discharge, Seyburn remained in Maine until sometime between July 1869 and March 1870 when he moved his family to Louisiana, principally due to the warmer climate, where he had acquired the Idlewild Plantation in Patterson, St. Mary Parish (some 80 miles (130 km) southwest of New Orleans). Idlewild was a sugar cane plantation and Isaac D. Seyburn earned his livelihood as a planter. His wife, Mary Ann, died on March 19, 1880, and Isaac D. Seyburn died on March 6, 1895.

== Postscript ==
Isaac D. Seyburn was of the Episcopal faith and attended services at the Holy Trinity Church in Patterson, Louisiana. When the church was deconsecrated in 1940, the stained glass window over the altar, known as the Seyburn Memorial, was acquired by St. Mary's Episcopal Church in nearby Franklin, Louisiana, where it remains today.

Idlewild Plantation remained in the family at least until Edward Isaac Seyburn's son, Edward Reynolds Seyburn, sold it in 1977. It was purchased by Dr. Walter H. Daniels. He and his wife Pam still reside in Idlewild. Dr. Daniels efforts got Idlewild Plantation listed on the National Register of Historic Places (Designation No. 82000459 of November 2, 1982).

One of the eight Flying Junior dinghies in the Vanderbilt Sailing Club fleet was named for Isaac D. Seyburn, who was the great great great grandfather of a former commodore of the club; another was named Lew Chew.
