= Sea captain =

Commander of a ship or other sea-going vessel

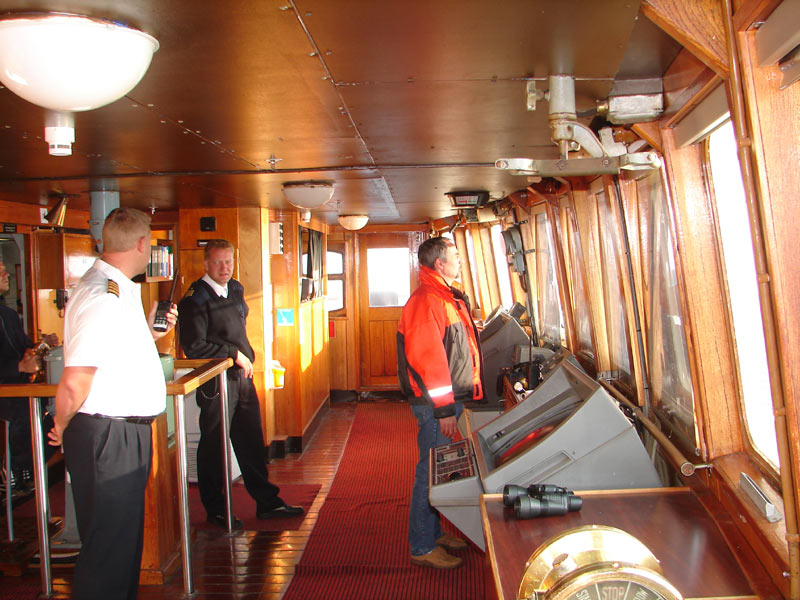
- The master works with the harbour pilot, the chief mate and an able seaman during inner navigation aboard the vessel Kristina Regina

General
- Other names: Ship's captain, ship's master, shipmaster, captain, master
- Department: Deck department
- Location: At sea
- Licensed: Yes
- Duties: In charge of a merchant ship.
- Requirements: master's license or extra master's license or commissioned officer

Watchstanding
- Watchstander: If needs

A sea captain, ship's captain, captain, master, or shipmaster, is a high-grade licensed mariner who holds ultimate command and responsibility of a merchant vessel. The captain is responsible for the safe and efficient operation of the ship, including its seaworthiness, safety and security, cargo operations, navigation, crew management, and legal compliance, and for the persons and cargo on board.

== Duties and functions ==
The captain ensures that the ship complies with local and international laws and complies also with company and flag state policies. The captain is ultimately responsible, under the law, for aspects of operation such as the safe navigation of the ship, its cleanliness and seaworthiness, safe handling of all cargo, management of all personnel, inventory of ship's cash and stores, and maintaining the ship's certificates and documentation.

One of a shipmaster's particularly important duties is to ensure compliance with the vessel's security plan, as required by the International Maritime Organization's ISPS Code. The plan, customized to meet the needs of each individual ship, spells out duties including conducting searches and inspections, maintaining restricted spaces, and responding to threats from terrorists, hijackers, pirates, and stowaways. The security plan also covers topics such as refugees and asylum seekers, smuggling, and saboteurs.

On ships without a purser, the captain is in charge of the ship's accounting. This includes ensuring an adequate amount of cash on board, coordinating the ship's payroll (including draws and advances), and managing the ship's slop chest.

On international voyages, the captain is responsible for satisfying requirements of the local immigration and customs officials. Immigration issues can include situations such as embarking and disembarking passengers, handling crew members who desert the ship, making crew changes in port, and making accommodations for foreign crew members. Customs requirements can include the master providing a cargo declaration, a ship's stores declaration, a declaration of crew members' personal effects, crew lists and passenger lists.

The captain has special responsibilities when the ship or its cargo are damaged or when the ship causes damage to other vessels or facilities. The master acts as a liaison to local investigators and is responsible for providing complete and accurate logbooks, reports, statements and evidence to document an incident. Specific examples of the ship causing external damage include collisions with other ships or with fixed objects, grounding the vessel, and dragging anchor. Some common causes of cargo damage include heavy weather, water damage, pilferage, and damage caused during loading/unloading by the stevedores.

All persons on board including public authorities, crew, and passengers are under the captain's authority and are their ultimate responsibility, particularly during navigation. In the case of injury or death of a crew member or passenger, the master is responsible to address any medical issues affecting the passengers and crew by providing medical care as possible, cooperating with onshore medical personnel, and, if necessary, evacuating those who need more assistance than can be provided on board the ship.

=== Performing marriages ===
There is a common belief that ship captains have historically been, and currently are, able to perform marriages. This depends on the country of registry, however, and most do not permit performance of a marriage by the master of a ship at sea.

In the United States Navy, a captain's powers are defined by its 1913 Code of Regulations, specifically stating: "The commanding officer shall not perform a marriage ceremony on board his ship or aircraft. He shall not permit a marriage ceremony to be performed on board when the ship or aircraft is outside the territory of the United States." However, there may be exceptions "in accordance with local laws and the laws of the state, territory, or district in which the parties are domiciled" and "in the presence of a diplomatic or consular official of the United States, who has consented to issue the certificates and make the returns required by the consular regulations."

Furthermore, in the United States, there have been a few contradictory legal precedents: courts did not recognize a shipboard marriage in California's 1898 Norman v. Norman but did in New York's 1929 Fisher v. Fisher (notwithstanding the absence of municipal laws so carried) and in 1933's Johnson v. Baker, an Oregon court ordered the payment of death benefits to a widow because she had established that her marriage at sea was lawful. However, in Fisher v. Fisher the involvement of the ship's captain was irrelevant to the outcome. New Jersey's 1919 Bolmer v. Edsall said a shipboard marriage ceremony is governed by the laws of the nation where ownership of the vessel lies.

In the United Kingdom, the captain of a merchant ship has never been permitted to perform marriages, although from 1854 any which took place had to be reported in the ship's log. A ship's master can, however, conduct a church service, regardless of any clergy aboard.

Spanish and Filipino law, as narrow exceptions, recognise a marriage in articulo mortis (on the point of death) solemnized by the captain of a ship or chief of an aeroplane during a voyage, or by the commanding officer of a military unit.

Japan allows ship captains to perform a marriage ceremony at sea, but only for Japanese citizens. Malta, Bermuda, and the Bahamas permit captains of ships registered in their jurisdictions to perform marriages at sea. Princess Cruises, whose ships are registered in Bermuda, has used this as a selling point for their cruises, while Cunard moved the registration of its ships Queen Mary 2, Queen Victoria and Queen Elizabeth from Southampton to Bermuda in 2011 to allow marriages to be conducted on their ships.

Some captains obtain other credentials (such as ordination as ministers of religion or accreditation as notaries public), which allow them to perform marriages in some jurisdictions where they would otherwise not be permitted to do so. Another possibility is a wedding on a ship in port, under the authority of an official from that port.

In the 1945 play The House in Montevideo, marriages at sea play a pivotal role. In other works of fiction, ship captains have performed marriages in various media, including the 1951 film The African Queen, Pirates of the Caribbean: At World's End, and episodes of The Love Boat, How I Met Your Mother, The Office and various Star Trek series.

== Licensing ==
Master Mariner certification is regulated internationally under the STCW Convention, specifically Regulation II/2 sets out requirements for Master Mariners. Master mariners can possess either an unlimited certification/licence or one restricted based on tonnage of the ship. Certification is given by national authorities, typically following completion of minimum necessary seatime and a course of approved training, based on the IMO model course.

=== Organisations ===
Many maritime countries have private or charitable organisations and associations for Master Mariners. These primarily include organisations to represent Masters in the industry. An example of a national organisation is the UK Honourable Company of Master Mariners. The international parent and representative body is the International Federation of Shipmasters' Associations which has consultative status at the International Maritime Organization.

== Employment ==
=== United Kingdom ===
As of 2008, the U.K. Learning and Skills Council lists annual salaries for senior deck officers as ranging from £22,000 to over £50,000 per year. The Council characterizes job opportunities for senior deck officers as "generally good" and expects a "considerable increase" in the job market over the next few years.

=== United States ===
As of 2013, captains of U.S.-flagged deep sea vessels make up to US$1,500 per day, or US$80,000 to US$300,000 per year. Captains of smaller vessels in the inland and coastal trade earn between US$350 and US$700 per day, or US$65,000 to $180,000 per year. Captains of large ferries average US$56,794 annually.

In 2005, 3,393 mariners held active unlimited master's licenses. Of these, 87 held near-coastal licenses with unlimited tonnage, 291 held unlimited tonnage master's licenses on inland and Great Lakes waters, while 1,044 held unlimited licenses upon inland waters only. Some 47,163 active masters licenses that year had tonnage restrictions, well over half of those being for near-coastal vessels of up to 100 tons gross tonnage.

As of 2006, some 34,000 people were employed as captains, mates, and pilots of water vessels in the United States. The U.S. Bureau of Labor Statistics projects 18% growth in this occupation, expecting demand for 40,000 shipmasters in 2016.

== Uniform ==
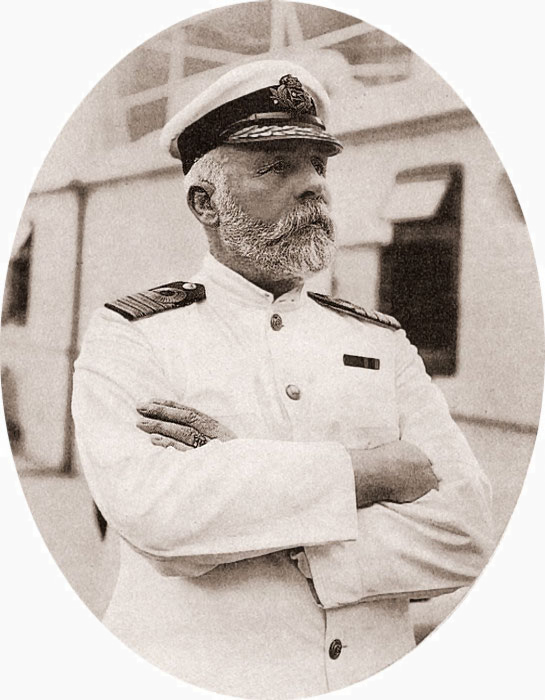
Captain of the RMS Titanic, E. J. Smith

Uniforms are worn aboard many ships, or aboard any vessels of traditional and organized navigation companies, and are required by company regulation on passenger and cruise vessels.

In the passenger-carrying trade a unified corporate image is often desired and it is useful for those unfamiliar with the vessel to be able to identify members of the crew and their function. Some companies and some countries use an executive curl similar to that of the Royal Navy.

In the United States, and in numerous other maritime countries, captains and officers of shipping companies may wear a merchant navy or merchant marine regular uniform in conjunction with their employment.

Rank insignia for sea captains

Greece

Italy (ships over 20,000 GRT)

Poland

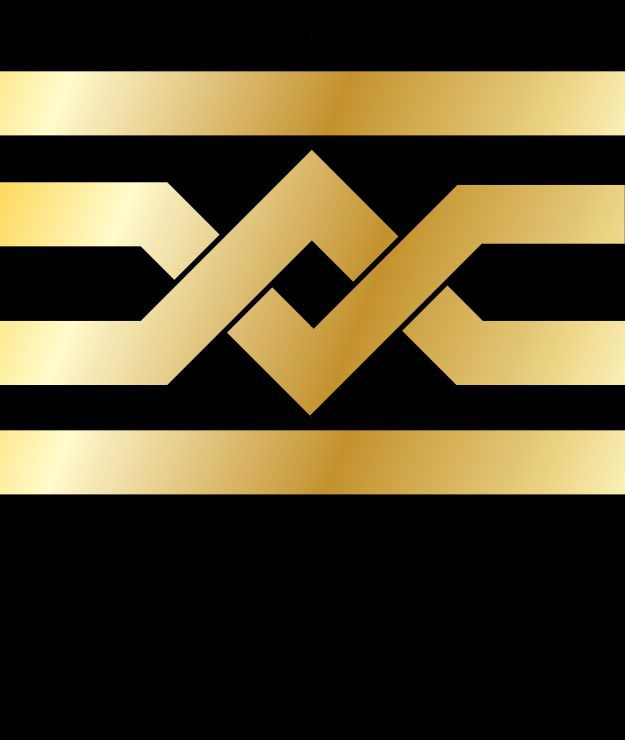
United Kingdom

== Related terms ==
=== Captain's seniority ===
In a few countries, such as UK, USA and Italy, some captains with particular experience in navigation and command at sea, may be named commodore or senior captain or captain senior grade.

=== Master ===
The term master is descended from the Latin magister navis, used during the imperial Roman age to designate the nobleman (patrician) who was in ultimate authority on board a vessel. The magister navis had the right to wear the laurus or corona laurèa and the corona navalis. Carrying on this tradition, the modern-day shipmaster of some nations wears golden laurel leaves or golden oak leaves on the visor of his cap.

=== Skipper ===
A skipper (sometimes also serving as the helmsman, helmansperson, or driver) is a person who has command of a boat or watercraft or tug, more or less equivalent to "captain in charge aboard ship". At sea, or upon lakes and rivers, the skipper as shipmaster or captain has command over the whole crew. The skipper may or may not be the owner of the boat.

The word is derived from the Middle Dutch scipper (Modern Dutch schipper), from scip ('ship').

The word "skipper" is used more than "captain" for some types of craft, for example fishing boats.

It is also more frequently used than captain with privately owned noncommercial or semi-commercial vessels, such as small yachts and other recreational boats, mostly in cases where the person in command of the boat may not be a licensed or professional captain, suggesting the term is less formal. In the U.S., a "skipper" who is in command of a charter vessel that carries paying passengers must be licensed by a state or the United States Coast Guard. If the vessel carries over six paying passengers, it must be an "inspected vessel" and a higher class license must be obtained by the skipper/master depending on the vessel's gross tons.

In the Royal Navy, Royal Marines, U.S. Navy, U.S. Marine Corps, U.S. Coast Guard, and merchant naval slang, it is a term used in reference to the commanding officer of any ship, base, or other command regardless of rank. It is generally only applied to someone who has earned the speaker's respect, and only used with the permission of the commander/commanding officer in question.

Skipper RNR was an actual rank used in the British Royal Naval Reserve for skippers of fishing boats who were members of the service. It was equivalent to warrant officer. Skippers could also be promoted to chief skipper RNR (equivalent to Commissioned Warrant Officer) and skipper lieutenant RNR.

== See also ==
- The captain goes down with the ship – Maritime tradition
- Bottomry – Arrangement in which the master of a ship borrows money using the ship as collateral
- Maritime pilot – Mariner who maneuvers ships through dangerous or congested waters
- List of sea captains
- Pilot in command – Flight crew role
- Category:Fictional captains
