= International Federation of Shipmasters' Associations =

- Abbreviation: IFSMA
- Formation: 1974
- Type: International Professional Organisation
- Purpose: To be the Serving Shipmasters' International Voice
- Headquarters: Borough Road; London, SE1; United Kingdom
- Region served: Global
- Members: 16,000 Shipmasters (2015)
- Official language: English
- General Secretary: Captain Andy Cook
- President: Captain Hans Sande
- Main organ: General Assembly
- Affiliations: International Maritime Organization, International Labour Organization
- Website: www.ifsma.org

The International Federation of Shipmasters' Associations (IFSMA), is the international professional organisation that unites and represents the world's serving Shipmasters.

The IFSMA is primarily concerned with representing the interests of the serving Shipmasters in bodies such as the International Maritime Organization, the International Labour Organization and other relevant, international and national organisations.

The purpose of IFSMA is to bring the Shipmasters' views on matters of marine safety, maritime security and protection of the marine environment to recognition at the required level and, at the same time, to forge a more exclusive and professional status for Shipmasters, one based upon their professional responsibility toward both shipowners and society.

The IFSMA is concerned about both international standards of professional competence for seafarers and international standards on conditions of work for seafarers.

The IFSMA is a federation with a policy to ensure safe operational practices, to prevent human injury, to protect the marine environment and to ensure the safety of life and property at sea.

The IFSMA headquarters are located in London, United Kingdom.

== About ==
=== History ===
IFSMA was formed by eight National Shipmasters' Associations and formally constituted on 1 January 1974, in Rotterdam with the aim to unite the world's serving Shipmasters into a single non-profit making international professional organisation.

The IFSMA office was moved to London in 1983 for close proximity to the London headquarters of the United Nations (UN) International Maritime Organization (IMO) at which IFSMA had been granted consultative status in 1975, only one year after IFSMAs inauguration. This consultative status as a Non-Government Organisation (NGO) enables IFSMA to represent the views and protect the interests of the serving Shipmasters unfettered and unfiltered either by national governments or by shipping companies.

In February 1993, IFSMA was placed on the International Labour Organization's (ILO) Special List of Non-Governmental International Organisations.

In the beginning of 2011, IFSMA started the MasterMarinerBenefitProgram™ a specialized benefit program for all serving Shipmasters, who are either a member of one of the IFSMA Member Associations or an IFSMA Individual Member.

In 2014, over 16,000 Shipmasters from almost 60 different countries are affiliated to IFSMA, either through their National Associations or as Individual Members.

=== IFSMA Founding Associations ===
IFSMA, the International Federation of Shipmasters' Associations was founded in 1974 by the following eight National Shipmasters' Associations:

- Association Nationale des Officiers et Marine du Commerce, Le Maillon, Paris, France
- Collegio Nazionale Patentati Capitani L.C. e D.M., Genova, Italy
- The Irish Institute of Master Mariners, Dublin, Ireland
- Koninklijk Belgisch Zeemannscollege, Antwerp, Belgium
- Nederlandse Vereniging van Kapiteins ter Koopvaardij, Rotterdam, Netherlands
- Norges Skibsforerforbund, Oslo, Norway
- The Society of Master Mariners South Africa, Cape Town, South Africa
- Verband Deutscher Kapitäne und Schiffsoffiziere, Hamburg, Germany

=== Presidents ===
| President | Period | Country of origin |
|---|---|---|
| Captain Ragnar Grønsand | 1974 - 1986 | Norway |
| Captain Gerhard Goldberg | 1986 - 1994 | Germany |
| Captain Hiroshi Kawashima | 1994 - 1998 | Japan |
| Captain Christer Lindvall | 1998 - 2014 | Sweden |
| Captain Hans Sande | 2014 - today | Norway |

=== Secretaries General ===
| Secretary General | Period | Country of origin |
|---|---|---|
| Captain F. P. A. Jamin | 01/1974 - 04/1974 | Netherlands |
| Captain Walter B. Vickers, CBE | 04/1974 - 11/1974 | United Kingdom |
| Commodore William E. Warwick, CBE | 11/1974 - 11/1975 | United Kingdom |
| Commander Basil D. H. Thomson | 11/1975 - 07/1976 | United Kingdom |
| Captain Nic W. C. Rutherford | 1981 - 1991 | United Kingdom |
| Captain David S. P. Moore | 1991 - 1993 | United Kingdom |
| Captain Roger Clipsham | 1993 - 2001 | United Kingdom |
| Captain Rodger M. MacDonald | 2001 - 2012 | United Kingdom |
| Captain John W. Dickie | 2012 - 2015 | United Kingdom |
| Captain Paul R. Owen (acting) | 2015 - 2016 | United Kingdom |
| Commodore Jim Scorer | 2016 - 2025 | United Kingdom |

== Senior Officer Legal Insurance ==
International Federation of Shipmasters' Associations
- Website: www.ifsma.org/resources/Legal-Insurance-SUMMARY.pdf

The policy of insurance shall be for the benefit of the nominated Ship Master and Chief Engineer and deemed thereafter to be the assured and shall remain in force throughout the currency of the policy whilst the assured is performing his or her duties as a Ship Master/Chief Engineer whilst officially assigned to a vessel.

The Senior Officer's Legal Insurance is backed by Lloyd's of London.

Senior Officer Legal Insurance provides for:

- Full coverage for defence and legal costs in criminal and civil proceedings up to EUR 1,000,000 or its equivalent
- Loss of Income
- Civil Liability and Defence

The above list is not exhaustive and the full policy conditions should be consulted before taking advantage of the IFSMA Senior Officer Legal Insurance Cover.

== Membership ==
=== Member Associations ===
| Country | Association | Acronym | Joint |
|---|---|---|---|
| Argentina | Centro de Capitanes de Ultramar y Oficiales de la Marina Mercante | CCUMM | 1980 |
| Australia | Company of Master Mariners of Australia | CMMA | 2009 |
| Belgium | Koninklijk Belgisch Zeemanscollege | KBZ | 1974 |
| Canada | Company of Master Mariners of Canada | CMMC | 2007 |
| Chile | Capitanes de Alta Mar de la Marina Mercante Nacional | NAUTILUS | 2006 |
| Denmark | Danish Maritime Officers | DMO | 1984 |
| Faroe Islands | Føroya Skipara- og Navigatørfelag | FSN | 2008 |
| Finland | Finish Ships Officers Union | FSOU | 1996 |
| France | Association des Capitaines et Officiers de la Marine Marchande | ACOMM | 1975 |
| France | Association Francaise des Capitaines de Navires | AFCAN | 1979 |
| Germany | Verband Deutscher Kapitäne und Schiffsoffiziere | VDKS | 1974 |
| Hong Kong | Anglo Eastern Ship Management | AESM | 1999 |
| Indonesia | Indonesian Merchant Marine Officers' Association | IMMOA | 2016 |
| Ireland | Irish Institute of Master Mariners | IIMM | 1974 |
| Japan | Japan Captains Association | JCA | 2008 |
| Latvia | Latvian Shipmasters' Association | LSMA | 2004 |
| Netherlands | Nautilus International | NAUTILUS NL | 2006 |
| Netherlands | Nederlandse Vereniging van Kapiteins ter Koopvaardij | NVKK | 1974 |
| Norway | Norwegian Maritime Officers Association | NMOA | 1974 |
| Pakistan | Master Mariners Society of Pakistan | MMSP | 2010 |
| Philippines | Associated Marine Officers' and Seamen's Union of the Philippines | AMOSUP | 2006 |
| Philippines | Society of Filipino Ship Captains | FILSCAPTS | 2010 |
| Russia | Far Eastern Seamasters' Association | FESMA | 1990 |
| Singapore | Singapore Maritime Officers' Union | SMOU | 2012 |
| Spain | Asociacion Vizcaina de Capitanes de la Marina Mercante | AVCMM | 1976 |
| Sweden | Maritime Officers`Association | MOA | 1985 |
| Turkey | Turkish Overseas Captains' Association | TOCA | 2013 |
| Ukraine | Odessa Shipmasters' Association | OSMA | 1989 |
| United Kingdom | Nautilus International | NAUTILUS UK | 2006 |
| United States of America | Council of American Master Mariners | CAMM | 1992 |
| United States of America | International Organisation of Masters Mates and Pilots | IOMMP | 2020 |

=== Honorary Members ===
| Name | Country of origin | Position | Elected | † |
|---|---|---|---|---|
| Captain Willem F. J. Mörzer Bruyns Sr. | Netherlands | First Vice President, IFSMA | 1982 | 1996 |
| H.E. Dr. Chandrika Prasad Srivastava, KCMG | India | Secretary-General Emeritus, The International Maritime Organization | 1985 | 2013 |
| Commodore William E. Warwick, CBE | United Kingdom | Secretary General (retired), IFSMA | 1992 | 1999 |
| Captain Nic W. C. Rutherford | United Kingdom | Secretary General (retired), IFSMA | 1992 | 2012 |
| H.E. Mr. William A. O'Neil, CMG, CM | Canada | Secretary-General Emeritus, The International Maritime Organization | 1993 | 2022 |
| Captain Henrik Sem | Norway | IFSMA Representative to IMO | 1993 | 2008 |
| Captain Gerhard Goldberg | Germany | President Emeritus, IFSMA | 1995 | 2007 |
| Captain Genji Yoshinaga | Japan | Former Liaison Officer of JCA to IFSMA | 1997 | 2014 |
| Captain Anna I. Schetinina | Russia | World's first Female Shipmaster in the Merchant Navy | 1998 | 1999 |
| Captain Hiroshi Kawashima | Japan | President Emeritus, IFSMA | 1998 | 2012 |
| Captain Roger Clipsham | United Kingdom | Secretary General (retired), IFSMA | 2002 | 2014 |
| H.E. Admiral Efthimios E. Mitropoulos | Greece | Secretary-General Emeritus, The International Maritime Organization | 2004 | |
| Mr. C. Julian Parker, OBE | United Kingdom | Inaugural Secretary (retired), The Nautical Institute | 2009 | |
| Mr. Michael Grey, MBE | United Kingdom | Editor (retired), Lloyd's List | 2009 | |
| H.E. Mr. Koji Sekimizu | Japan | Secretary-General Emeritus, The International Maritime Organization | 2012 | |
| Captain Rodger M. MacDonald | United Kingdom | Secretary General (retired), IFSMA | 2012 | |
| Captain Christer Lindvall | Sweden | President Emeritus, IFSMA | 2014 | |
| Captain Bjorn Haave | Norway | IFSMA Representative to IMO | 2014 | |
| H.E. Mr. Kitack Lim | Korea | Secretary-General, The International Maritime Organization | 2018 | |
| Captain Koichi Akatsuka | Japan | Vice President, IFSMA | 2019 | |
| H.E. Mr. Arsenio Dominguez | Panama | Secretary-General, The International Maritime Organization | 2024 | |

== See also ==
- Seafarer's Professions and Ranks

- Shipmaster
- Master Mariner

- International Maritime Organization

- International Convention for the Prevention of Pollution From Ships (MARPOL, 1973/1978)
- International Convention for the Safety of Life at Sea (SOLAS, 1974)
- International Convention on Standards of Training, Certification and Watchkeeping for Seafarers (STCW, 1978/1995/2010)

- International Labour Organization

- Maritime Labour Convention (MLC, 2006)
