= USS Kittatinny =

Gunboat of the United States Navy

History

United States
- Acquired: 21 September 1861
- Commissioned: 9 December 1861
- Decommissioned: 14 September 1865
- Fate: Sold, 27 September 1865

General characteristics
- Displacement: 450 tons
- Length: 129 ft (39 m)
- Beam: 29 ft (8.8 m)
- Depth of hold: 11 ft 6 in (3.51 m)
- Propulsion: sail
- Complement: 66
- Armament: four 32-pounder guns

USS Kittatinny was a schooner originally named Stars and Stripes, which was acquired by the Union Navy during the American Civil War. She was used by the Union Navy as a gunboat in support of the Union Navy blockade of Confederate waterways.

== Service history ==
Kittatinny was a three-masted schooner purchased by the Navy at Philadelphia, Pennsylvania, as Stars and Stripes from Simpson and Neile 21 September 1861; and commissioned at Philadelphia Navy Yard 9 December 1861, Lt. George E. Welch in command. Assigned to the Gulf Blockading Squadron, she departed the Delaware River 20 December and reached Key West, Florida, 10 days later. An active blockader in the Gulf of Mexico, she shared in the capture of Major Barbour attempting to slip through the blockade with a cargo of gunpowder, niter, sulfur, percussion caps, and lead for the Confederate Army. She took schooner Julio near Barataria, Louisiana, 11 May and captured schooner Emma 27 September. Schooner Matilda fell prey to the vigilant Union blockader off Matagarda Bay, Texas, 25 November; and schooner Diana was taken the next day. Kittatinny took sloop D. Sargent off Galveston, Texas, 12 March 1863 shortly before sailing to New York City for repairs.

Kittatinny recommissioned at New York 10 June 1863, Acting Master Isaac D. Seyburn in command. On the 15th she sailed on a cruise in the North Atlantic Ocean seeking Confederate raider Tacony, a ship taking a heavy toll on Northern shipping. She returned to New York City on the 29th and sailed 11 August to return to the West Gulf Blockading Squadron for duty off the Texas coast. She arrived on station 2 September, and on the 22d she chased an unidentified schooner ashore where the blockade runner was burned by her crew. She captured schooner Reserve 25 October. Early in 1864 Kittatinny sailed via New Orleans, Louisiana, to Pensacola, Florida, where she was based for over a year. On 25 March 1865, she sailed for Mobile Bay, where she served until after the end of the Civil War. She stood out from Mobile Bay 8 August; touched Pensacola; and arrived New York City 1 September where she decommissioned on the 14th. Kittatinny was sold at public auction 27 September 1865 to D. McCarty & Son.
