= Italo Oxilia =

Italian antifascist boat captain

Italo Oxilia (3 August 1887 – 16 June 1971) was an Italian anti-fascist. He used his skills as a boat captain to help members of the Italian Resistance to flee the country and to transport Italian republican volunteers to the Spanish Civil War.

== Biography ==
Italo Oxilia was born to Giovanni Oxilia and Maria Malagamba on 3 August 1887 in Bergeggi, Liguria. An expert captain, he secretly expatriated Filippo Turati, Sandro Pertini, Ferruccio Parri, and Carlo Rosselli to Calvi in Corsica on 12 December 1926, by carrying him over the border on a motorboat he brought from Savona. He was condemned to prison, in absentia.

In exile, he lived for a while in France and Belgium, where he was an office worker and joined the Giustizia e Libertà movement. The house and land in Quiliano that his father had left to him was confiscated. He returned to Italy to help with a second flight. In July 1929, he helped the confined politicians Carlo Rosselli, Emilio Lussu, and Francesco Fausto Nitti escape from the island Lipari with a small yacht.

Oxilia then worked with several merchants that ferried Italian republican volunteers to the Spanish Civil War. When he returned to Italy, he was arrested in 1940 but was released by Mussolini. During the Italian resistance, he guided the SAP Matteotti group (part of the Brigate Garibaldi) in Villapiana, Calabria. Afterwards, he directed the journal Giustizia e Libertà, the journal of the Savonese section of the Action Party, and served as a councilor to the Savonese communist politician Andrea Aglietto.

After the war and these assignments, however, he lived in poverty until his death due to a lung illness on 16 June 1971.

== Bibliography ==
- "Sentenza del "processo di Savona"" (PDF) (in Italian). Archived from the original (PDF) on 2013-07-02.
- "Premiato a Savona l'antifascista che fece fuggire Turati e Rosselli". La Stampa (in Italian). 30 June 1968.
- "Associazione Nazionale Sandro Pertini". www.pertini.it.
