= Campbell Macquarie (1812 shipwreck) =

Coordinates: 54.62°S 158.86°E

History

United Kingdom
- Name: Campbell Macquarie
- Namesake: Campbell Island, New Zealand & Macquarie Island
- Port of registry: Calcutta, India
- Acquired: 1810 by purchase
- Fate: Wrecked, 10 June 1812
- Notes: This is the first of three vessels by this name.

General characteristics
- Tons burthen: 235, or 248 bm
- Sail plan: Full-rigged ship
- Crew: 42

Campbell Macquarie was a ship that Joseph Underwood, a Sydney merchant, purchased at Calcutta in 1810. She appears, with Richard Siddins, master, in a list of vessels registered at Calcutta in 1811. She was wrecked near Macquarie Island in 1812.

She brought general merchandise and transported a number of convicts from Calcutta, arriving in Sydney on 17 January 1812.

On 22 March 1812 Campbell Macquarie, Captain Richard Siddins (or Siddons), left Sydney and arrived at Kangaroo Island, South Australia on 29 April 1812. There it took on board 1,650 seal skins and 33 tons of salt. On 21 May it left Kangaroo Island for Macquarie Island. At midnight on 10 June rocks were spotted. Tacking was not possible and so an anchor was dropped. Campbell Macquarie struck the rocks at 1.30am and by 2am her stern post broke and water poured in. The pumps were unable to cope with the inflow and at daylight the crew began unloading the cargo, sails, and rigging. Much of it was saved, only to be destroyed weeks later in a storm. On 28 June the crew burnt the ship to salvage its ironwork.

The crew consisted of 12 Europeans and 30 Lascars, of whom four died whilst waiting for rescue.

On 20 October 1812, Perseverance rescued 12 of the crew when she called at the island to take on board another sealing party. The remainder were rescued some months later.
