= Ida Lee =

Australian historian and poet

Ida Lee FRGS FRAHS
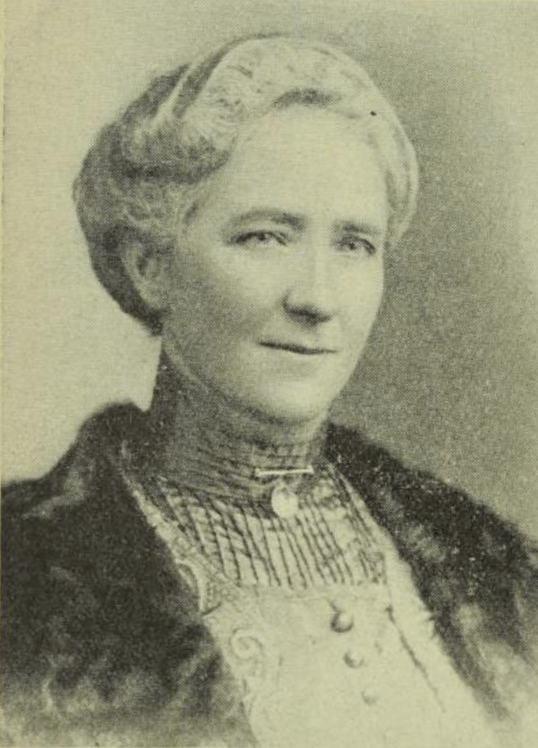
- Lee in 1915
- Born: Ida Louisa Lee; 11 February 1865; Kelso, New South Wales, Australia
- Died: 3 October 1943 (aged 78); Norwich, Norfolk, England
- Occupations: Historian and poet
- Relatives: George Lee (father)
- Writing career
- Notable works: Commodore Sir John Hayes, his Voyage and Life (1912)

Ida Louisa Lee (11 February 1865 — 3 October 1943), historian and poet, was born at Kelso, New South Wales. She was elected a Fellow of the Royal Geographical Society (FRGS) in 1914 and an Honorary Fellow of the Royal Australian Historical Society (Hon. FRAHS). Lee wrote a number of historical texts, some of which contain previously unpublished material.

Lee was the third child of grazier and politician, George Lee, and Louisa (née Kite). On a visit to England, Lee married Charles John Bruce Marriott (1861–1936) on 14 October 1891 at the parish church, Felixstowe, Suffolk.

== Bibliography ==
=== Non-fiction ===
- The Coming of the British to Australia, 1788-1829 (1906)
- Commodore Sir John Hayes (1912)
- The Logbooks of the 'Lady Nelson' (1915)
- Captain Bligh's Second Voyage to the South Sea (1920)
- Early Explorers in Australia (1925)
- The Voyage of the 'Caroline' from England to Van Dieman's Land and Batavia (1927)

=== Poetry ===
- Songs and Verse (189?)
- The Bush Fire and Other Verses (1897)
