= Gargoyle Bastion =

Rocky headland in the South Shetland Islands, Antarctica

Location of Varna Peninsula in the South Shetland Islands.

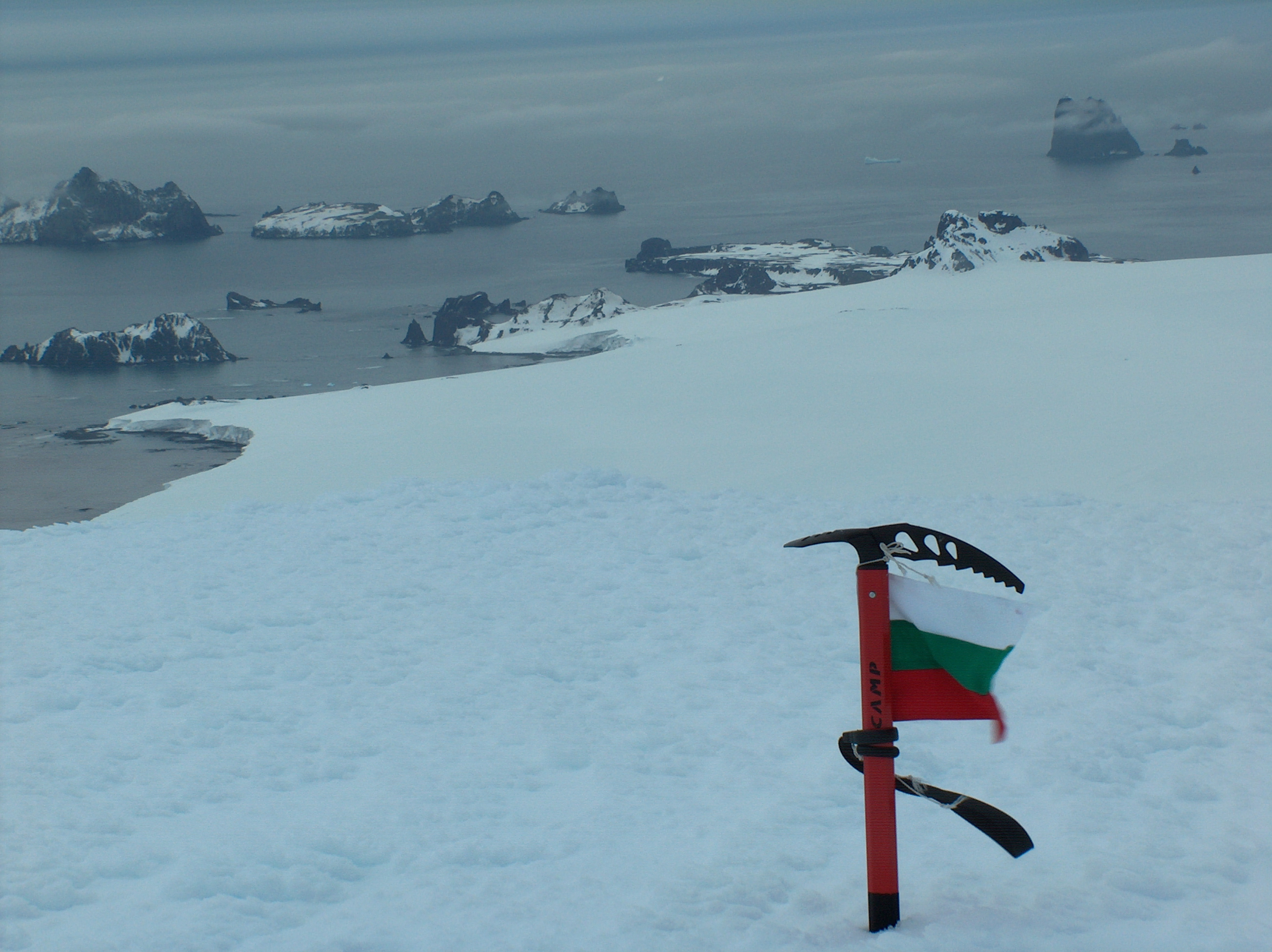
Gargoyle Bastion (next left of Sayer Nunatak and in front of Williams Point) from Miziya Peak, with Zavala Island in the foreground, Zed Islands in the background, and Pyramid Island on the right.

Gargoyle Bastion is a rocky headland rising to 60 m on the northwest coast of Varna Peninsula, Livingston Island in the South Shetland Islands, Antarctica and forming the south side of the entrance to Hydra Cove and the northeast side of the entrance to Griffin Cove. It has sub-vertical cliff faces to seaward, and is flanked to north and south by rock cliffs.

The feature is named after the mythical Gargoyle, a dragon-monster.

== Location ==
The point is located at 62°27′58″S 60°08′24″W which is 830 m northeast of Organpipe Point, 460 m east by south of Aspis Island and 1.57 km south-southwest of Williams Point (British mapping in 1968, and Bulgarian in 2005 and 2009).

== Maps ==
- L.L. Ivanov et al. Antarctica: Livingston Island and Greenwich Island, South Shetland Islands. Scale 1:100000 topographic map. Sofia: Antarctic Place-names Commission of Bulgaria, 2005.
- L.L. Ivanov. Antarctica: Livingston Island and Greenwich, Robert, Snow and Smith Islands. Scale 1:120000 topographic map. Troyan: Manfred Wörner Foundation, 2009.
