= Pogledets Island =

Island in the South Shetland Islands

- Location of Varna Peninsula on Livingston Island in the South Shetland Islands

- Location within Antarctica Location within Antarctic Peninsula

Geography
- Location: Antarctica
- Coordinates: 62°27′39.7″S 60°09′30″W
- Archipelago: South Shetland Islands

Administration
- Antarctica
- Administered under the Antarctic Treaty System

Demographics
- Population: Uninhabited

Pogledets Island (Bulgarian: остров Погледец, romanized: ostrov Pogledets, IPA: [ˈɔstrof ˈpɔɡlɛdɛt͡s]) is the northernmost of Dunbar Islands off Varna Peninsula, Livingston Island in the South Shetland Islands. The feature is ice-free, crescent shaped facing southwest, and extending 200 m in north-south direction and 170 m in east-west direction. The area was visited by early 19th century sealers.

The island is named after Pogledets Peak in Rila Mountain and its namesake in Stara Planina, Bulgaria.

== Location ==
Pogledets Island is located 860 m northeast of Zavala Island, 450 m northwest of Aspis Island and 1.45 km southwest of Williams Point, Livingston Island. British mapping in 1968 and Bulgarian mapping in 2009.

== Maps ==
- Livingston Island to King George Island. Scale 1:200000. Admiralty Nautical Chart 1776. Taunton: UK Hydrographic Office, 1968.
- L.L. Ivanov. Antarctica: Livingston Island and Greenwich, Robert, Snow and Smith Islands. Scale 1:120000 topographic map. Troyan: Manfred Wörner Foundation, 2009. ISBN 978-954-92032-6-4 (Second edition 2010, ISBN 978-954-92032-9-5)
- Antarctic Digital Database (ADD). Scale 1:250000 topographic map of Antarctica. Scientific Committee on Antarctic Research (SCAR). Since 1993, regularly upgraded and updated.
