= Sigritsa Point =

Ice-free point in the South Shetland Islands, Antarctica

Location of Varna Peninsula on Livingston Island in the South Shetland Islands.

Topographic map of Livingston Island, Greenwich, Robert, Snow and Smith Islands.

Sigritsa Point (Nos Sigritsa \'nos si-'gri-tsa\) is an ice-free point on the northeast coast of Varna Peninsula, Livingston Island in the South Shetland Islands, Antarctica forming the northwest side of the entrance to Dragon Cove. The area was visited by 19th century sealers.

The feature is named after Teodor Sigritsa, Kavhan (hereditary viceroy function) under the Bulgarian ruler Czar Simeon the Great (9-10th century AD).

== Location ==
The point is located at 62°27′54″S 60°07′20″W, which is 1.6 km south-southeast of Williams Point, 1.07 m northeast of Sayer Nunatak, and 810 m west-northwest of Ficheto Point. British mapping was done in 1968, Bulgarian mapping was done in 2005 and 2009.

== Maps ==
- L.L. Ivanov et al. Antarctica: Livingston Island and Greenwich Island, South Shetland Islands. Scale 1:100000 topographic map. Sofia: Antarctic Place-names Commission of Bulgaria, 2005.
- L.L. Ivanov. Antarctica: Livingston Island and Greenwich, Robert, Snow and Smith Islands. Scale 1:120000 topographic map. Troyan: Manfred Wörner Foundation, 2009. ISBN 978-954-92032-6-4
