= Aspis Island =

Uninhabited Antarctic island

- Location of Varna Peninsula on Livingston Island in the South Shetland Islands.

- Location within Antarctica Location within Antarctic Peninsula

Geography
- Coordinates: 62°27′54.5″S 60°08′59.1″W
- Archipelago: Dunbar Islands
- Highest elevation: 15 m (49 ft)

Administration
- Administered under the Antarctic Treaty System

Demographics
- Population: Uninhabited

Topographic map of Livingston Island and Smith Island.

Aspis Island is a small, low-lying, ice-free island rising to 15 metres (49 ft), easternmost in the Dunbar group off the northwest coast of Varna Peninsula, Livingston Island in the South Shetland Islands, Antarctica.

The feature is named after the Aspis, a small musical dragon, often portrayed in medieval literature.

== Location ==
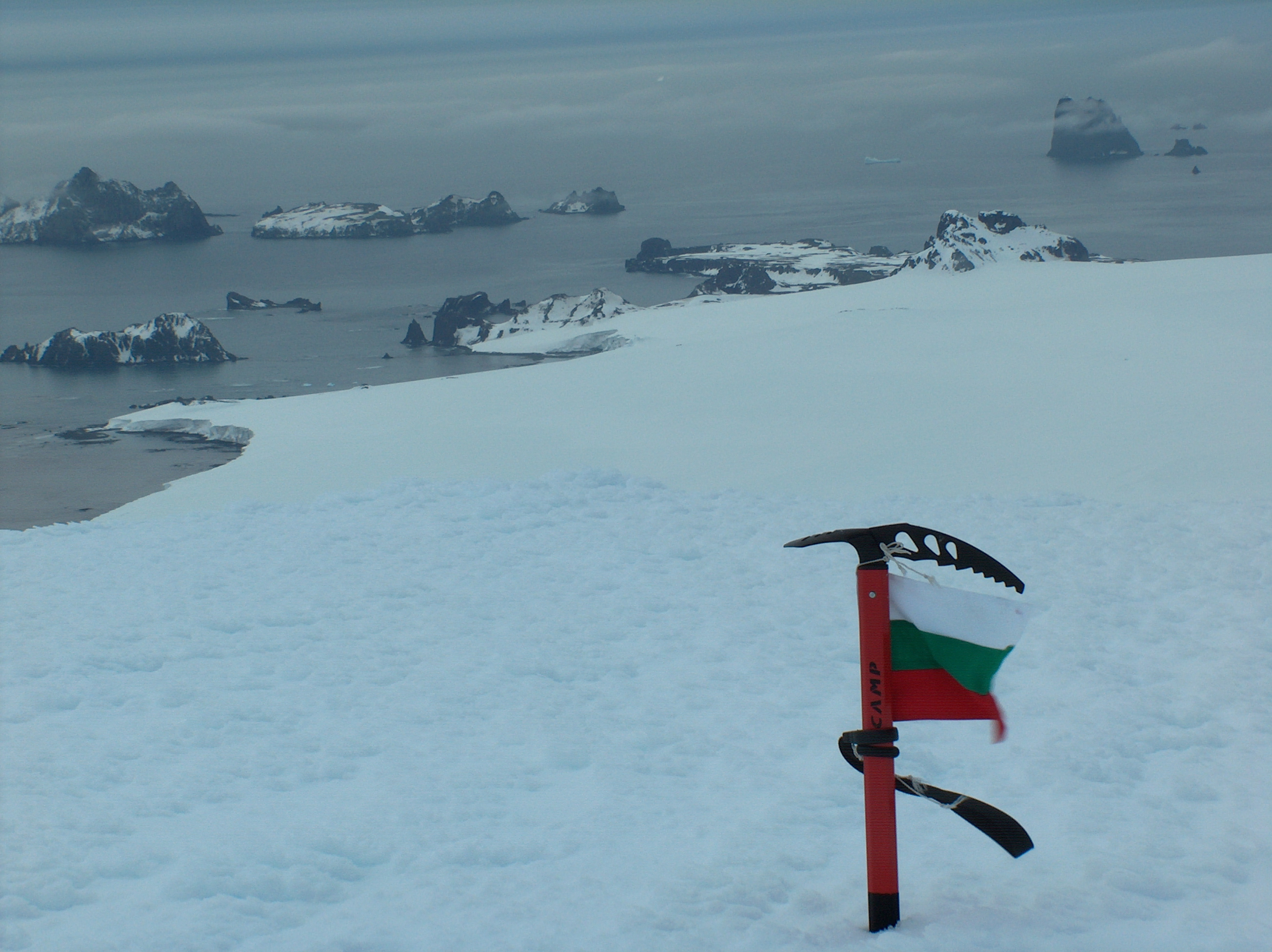
Aspis Island (showing next behind the second left point, the Organpipe) from Miziya Peak, with Zavala Island in the foreground and Zed Islands in the background.

Aspis Island is centred at 62°27′54.5″S 60°08′59.1″W which is 520 m (570 yd) west by north of Gargoyle Bastion, 670 m (730 yd) north of Organpipe Point, 800 m (870 yd) northeast of Zavala Island and 1.59 km (0.99 mi) south-southwest of Williams Point (British mapping in 1968, and Bulgarian in 2005 and 2009).

== Maps ==
- L.L. Ivanov et al. Antarctica: Livingston Island and Greenwich Island, South Shetland Islands. Scale 1:100000 topographic map. Sofia: Antarctic Place-names Commission of Bulgaria, 2005.
- L.L. Ivanov. Antarctica: Livingston Island and Greenwich, Robert, Snow and Smith Islands. Scale 1:120000 topographic map. Troyan: Manfred Wörner Foundation, 2009. ISBN 978-954-92032-6-4
- Antarctic Digital Database (ADD). Scale 1:250000 topographic map of Antarctica. Scientific Committee on Antarctic Research (SCAR). Since 1993, regularly upgraded and updated.
- L.L. Ivanov. Antarctica: Livingston Island and Smith Island. Scale 1:100000 topographic map. Manfred Wörner Foundation, 2017. ISBN 978-619-90008-3-0

== See also ==
- Composite Antarctic Gazetteer
- List of Antarctic islands south of 60° S
- SCAR
- Territorial claims in Antarctica
