= Ficheto Point =

Point on Livingston Island, Antarctica

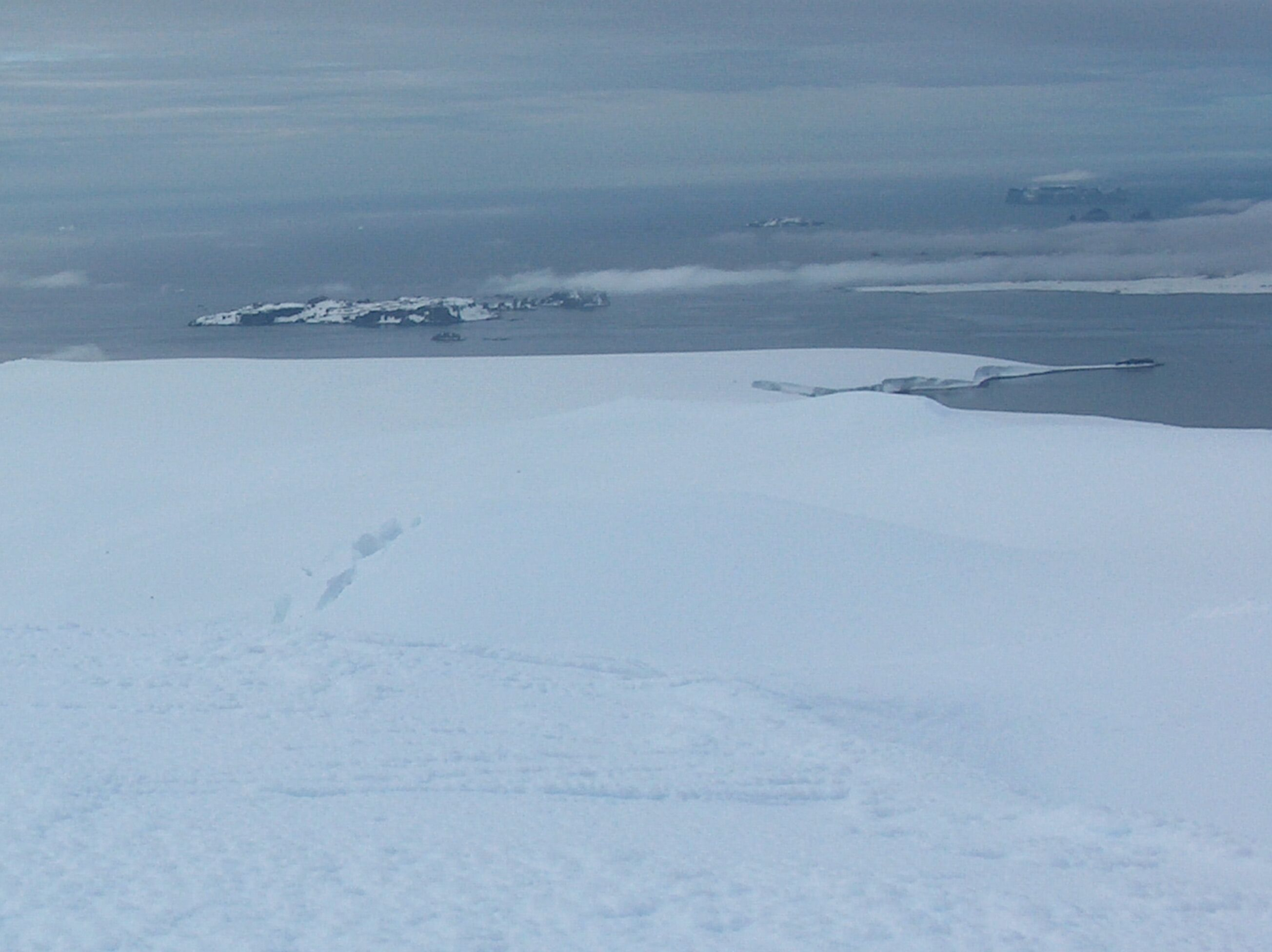
- Channel Rock from Miziya Peak, with Meade Islands in the background; Ficheto Point is on the left and Pomorie Point on the right.

- Location of Ficheto Point

- Location within Antarctic Peninsula Location within Antarctica

Geography
- Location: Antarctica
- Coordinates: 62°28′04″S 60°06′35″W
- Archipelago: South Shetland Islands

Administration
- Antarctica
- Administered under the Antarctic Treaty System

Demographics
- Population: uninhabited

Ficheto Point (Nos Ficheto 'nos 'fi-che-to) is an ice-free point on the northeast coast of Varna Peninsula, Livingston Island, Antarctica forming the southeast side of the entrance to Dragon Cove. Channel Rock (62°27′47.8″S 60°04′51.5″W) is lying in the adjacent northwestern part of McFarlane Strait, 1.3 km (0.81 mi) northeast of Ficheto Point and 920 m (1,010 yd) south-southwest of Meade Islands. The area was visited by 19th century sealers.

The point is named after the famous Bulgarian architect, builder and sculptor Nikola Fichev – ‘Kolyu Ficheto’ (1800–1881). Channel Rock was charted and descriptively named by the Discovery Investigations in 1935.

== Location ==
Ficheto Point is located at 62°28′04″S 60°06′28″W which is2.3 km (1.4 mi) southeast of Williams Point, 800 m (870 yd) east-southeast of Sigritsa Point, 1.3 km (0.81 mi) east of Sayer Nunatak and 2.9 km (1.8 mi) northwest of Pomorie Point. (British mapping in 1935 and 1968, Bulgarian in 2005 and 2009).

Topographic map of Livingston Island, Greenwich, Robert, Snow and Smith Islands.

== See also ==
- Composite Antarctic Gazetteer
- List of Antarctic islands south of 60° S
- SCAR
- Territorial claims in Antarctica

== Maps ==
- L.L. Ivanov et al. Antarctica: Livingston Island and Greenwich Island, South Shetland Islands. Scale 1:100000 topographic map. Sofia: Antarctic Place-names Commission of Bulgaria, 2005.
- L.L. Ivanov. Antarctica: Livingston Island and Greenwich, Robert, Snow and Smith Islands. Scale 1:120000 topographic map. Troyan: Manfred Wörner Foundation, 2009. ISBN 978-954-92032-6-4
