= Iglika =

Iglika (Bulgarian: Иглика) may refer to:

== Places ==
- Iglika, Gabrovo Province, Bulgaria
- Iglika, Shumen Province, Shumen Province, Bulgaria
- Iglika, Yambol Province, Yambol Province, Bulgaria
- Iglika Passage – Passage in the South Shetland Islands, Antarctica

== Other ==
- 14342 Iglika, minor planet
- Iglika (given name), Bulgarian feminine given name
