= Melyane Island =

Island in the Antarctic

- Location of Varna Peninsula on Livingston Island in the South Shetland Islands

- Location within Antarctica Location within Antarctic Peninsula

Geography
- Location: Antarctica
- Coordinates: 62°28′44.2″S 60°11′23″W
- Archipelago: South Shetland Islands

Administration
- Administered under the Antarctic Treaty System

Demographics
- Population: Uninhabited

Melyane Island (Bulgarian: остров Меляне, romanized: ostrov Melyane, IPA: [ˈɔstrof ˈmɛʎɐnɛ]) is the southernmost of Dunbar Islands off Varna Peninsula, Livingston Island in the South Shetland Islands. The feature is ice-free, extending 280 m in southeast–northwest direction and 90 m wide. The area was visited by early 19th century sealers.

The island is named after the settlement of Melyane in Northwestern Bulgaria.

== Location ==
Melyane Island is located at 62°28′44.2″S 60°11′23″W, which is 250 m south of Balsha Island, 1.27 km west of Slab Point and 2.52 km north-northeast of Kotis Point, Livingston Island. British mapping in 1968 and Bulgarian mapping in 2009.

== Maps ==
- Livingston Island to King George Island. Scale 1:200000. Admiralty Nautical Chart 1776. Taunton: UK Hydrographic Office, 1968.
- L.L. Ivanov. Antarctica: Livingston Island and Greenwich, Robert, Snow and Smith Islands. Scale 1:120000 topographic map. Troyan: Manfred Wörner Foundation, 2009. ISBN 978-954-92032-6-4 (Second edition 2010, ISBN 978-954-92032-9-5)
- Antarctic Digital Database (ADD). Scale 1:250000 topographic map of Antarctica. Scientific Committee on Antarctic Research (SCAR). Since 1993, regularly upgraded and updated.
