= Zhelyava Hill =

Location of Varna Peninsula on Livingston Island in the South Shetland Islands.

Topographic map of Livingston Island and Smith Island

Zhelyava Hill (Bulgarian: хълм Желява, ‘Halm Zhelyava’ \'h&lm zhe-'lya-va\) is the ice-covered hill of elevation 237 m (778 ft) in the north part of Vidin Heights on Varna Peninsula, Livingston Island in the South Shetland Islands, Antarctica. It overlooks Williams Point to the north, Rose Valley Glacier to the southeast and Saedinenie Snowfield to the southwest.

The feature is named after the settlement of Zhelyava in western Bulgaria.

== Location ==
Zhelyava Hill is located at 62°29′33″S 60°08′09″W, which is at the base of Phelps Promontory, 4 km (2.5 mi) north of Passy Peak and 2.2 km (1.4 mi) south of Sayer Nunatak. Bulgarian topographic survey Tangra 2004/05. British mapping in 1968, Spanish in 1991 and Bulgarian in 2009.

== Maps ==
- L.L. Ivanov et al. Antarctica: Livingston Island and Greenwich Island, South Shetland Islands. Scale 1:100000 topographic map. Sofia: Antarctic Place-names Commission of Bulgaria, 2005.
- L.L. Ivanov. Antarctica: Livingston Island and Greenwich, Robert, Snow and Smith Islands. Scale 1:120000 topographic map. Troyan: Manfred Wörner Foundation, 2010. ISBN 978-954-92032-9-5 (First edition 2009. ISBN 978-954-92032-6-4)
- Antarctic Digital Database (ADD). Scale 1:250000 topographic map of Antarctica. Scientific Committee on Antarctic Research (SCAR). Since 1993, regularly updated.
- L.L. Ivanov. Antarctica: Livingston Island and Smith Island. Scale 1:100000 topographic map. Manfred Wörner Foundation, 2017. ISBN 978-619-90008-3-0
