= Dlagnya Rocks =

Rocks in Antarctica

- Location of Dlagnya Rocks

- Location within Antarctica Location within Antarctic Peninsula

Geography
- Location: Antarctica
- Coordinates: 62°25′38″S 60°09′39″W
- Archipelago: South Shetland Islands

Administration
- Antarctica
- Administered under the Antarctic Treaty System

Demographics
- Population: uninhabited

Dlagnya Rocks (Bulgarian: скали Длъгня, ‘Skali Dlagnya’ \ska-'li 'dl&g-nya\) are the several contiguous rocks in Zed Islands off Varna Peninsula, Livingston Island in the South Shetland Islands extending 540 m in north-south direction and 60 m wide. The area was visited by early 19th century sealers.

The rocks are named after the settlement of Dlagnya in Northern Bulgaria.

== Location ==
Dlagnya Rocks are centred at 62°25′38″S 60°09′39″W and situated 150 m east of Esperanto Island and 100 m west-southwest of Goritsa Rocks. British mapping in 1968 and Bulgarian mapping in 2009.

Topographic map of Livingston Island, Greenwich, Robert, Snow and Smith Islands.

== Maps ==
- Livingston Island to King George Island. Scale 1:200000. Admiralty Nautical Chart 1776. Taunton: UK Hydrographic Office, 1968.
- L.L. Ivanov. Antarctica: Livingston Island and Greenwich, Robert, Snow and Smith Islands. Scale 1:120000 topographic map. Troyan: Manfred Wörner Foundation, 2009. ISBN 978-954-92032-6-4 (Second edition 2010, ISBN 978-954-92032-9-5)
- Antarctic Digital Database (ADD). Scale 1:250000 topographic map of Antarctica. Scientific Committee on Antarctic Research (SCAR). Since 1993, regularly upgraded and updated.
