= Hydra Cove =

Cove in the South Shetland Islands, Antarctica

Location of Varna Peninsula in the South Shetland Islands.

Hydra Cove is a small cove indenting for 200 m the northwest coast of Varna Peninsula, Livingston Island in the South Shetland Islands, Antarctica and entered north of Gargoyle Bastion.

The feature is named after the Lernaean Hydra, a monster with nine heads slain by Hercules.

== Location ==
The cove is centred at 62°27′54″S 60°08′15″W which is 17.7 km northeast of Siddins Point and 1.42 km south of Williams Point (British mapping in 1968, and Bulgarian mapping in 2005 and 2009).

== Maps ==
- L.L. Ivanov et al. Antarctica: Livingston Island and Greenwich Island, South Shetland Islands. Scale 1:100000 topographic map. Sofia: Antarctic Place-names Commission of Bulgaria, 2005.
- L.L. Ivanov. Antarctica: Livingston Island and Greenwich, Robert, Snow and Smith Islands. Scale 1:120000 topographic map. Troyan: Manfred Wörner Foundation, 2009. ISBN 978-954-92032-6-4
