= Koshava Island =

Island in the South Shetland Islands, Antarctica

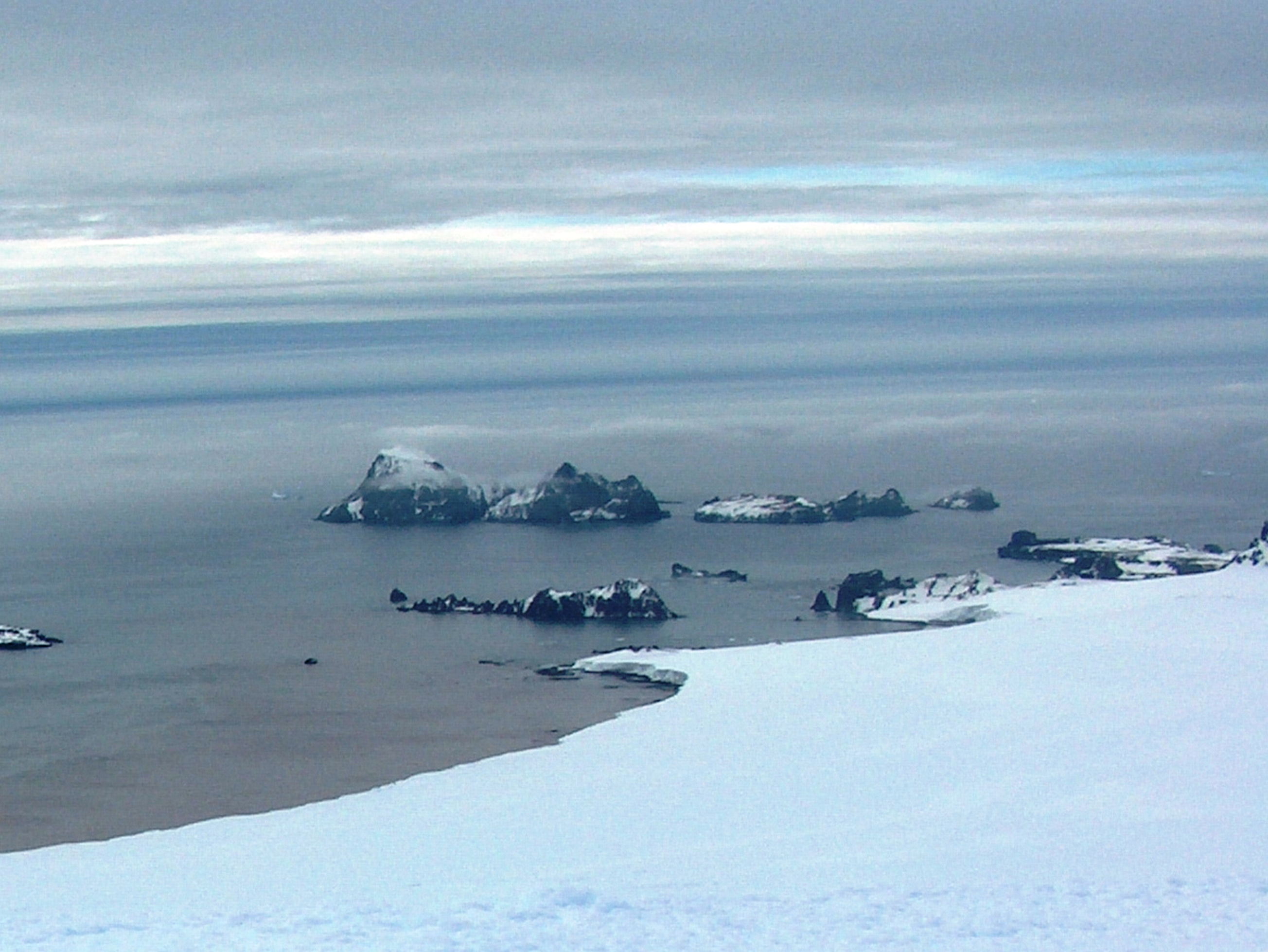
- Zed Islands from Miziya Peak; Koshava Island is the rightmost one.

- Location of Varna Peninsula in the South Shetland Islands

- Location on Antarctic Peninsula Location in Antarctica

Geography
- Location: Antarctica
- Coordinates: 62°25′59″S 60°08′11″W
- Archipelago: Zed Islands
- Length: 0.34 km (0.211 mi)
- Width: 0.22 km (0.137 mi)

Administration
- Administered under the Antarctic Treaty System

Demographics
- Population: Uninhabited

Koshava Island (Bulgarian: остров Кошава, romanized: ostrov Koshava, IPA: [ˈɔstrof koˈʃavɐ]) is the easternmost island in the Zed group off Varna Peninsula, northeastern Livingston Island in the South Shetland Islands, Antarctica. The island is ice-free, extending 340 by 220 m (370 by 240 yd). Situated on the west side of the north entrance to McFarlane Strait, 140 m (150 yd) northeast of Lesidren Island, and 1.9 km (1.2 mi) north of Williams Point on Livingston Island. The area was visited by early 19th century sealers.

The island is named after the settlement of Koshava in northwestern Bulgaria.

== Location ==
Koshava Island is located at 62°25′59″S 60°08′11″W. Bulgarian mapping in 2009.

Topographic map of Livingston Island and Smith Island

== See also ==
- Composite Gazetteer of Antarctica
- List of Antarctic islands south of 60° S
- Scientific Committee on Antarctic Research
- Territorial claims in Antarctica

== Maps ==
- Livingston Island to King George Island. Scale 1:200000. Admiralty Nautical Chart 1776. Taunton: UK Hydrographic Office, 1968.
- L.L. Ivanov. Antarctica: Livingston Island and Greenwich, Robert, Snow and Smith Islands. Scale 1:120000 topographic map. Troyan: Manfred Wörner Foundation, 2009. ISBN 978-954-92032-6-4 (Second edition 2010, ISBN 978-954-92032-9-5)
- Antarctic Digital Database (ADD). Scale 1:250000 topographic map of Antarctica. Scientific Committee on Antarctic Research (SCAR). Since 1993, regularly upgraded and updated.
