= Dragon Cove =

Cove in the South Shetland Islands, Antarctica

Location of Varna Peninsula on Livingston Island in the South Shetland Islands.

Topographic map of Livingston Island, Greenwich, Robert, Snow and Smith Islands.

Dragon Cove is a 550 m wide cove indenting for 600 m the northeast coast of Varna Peninsula, Livingston Island in the South Shetland Islands, Antarctica entered between Sigritsa Point and Ficheto Point. Surmounted by Sayer Nunatak on the southwest. The area was visited by early 19th century sealers.

The feature is named after the brig Dragon (Captain MacFarlane) of Valparaíso (Formerly Liverpool), which visited the South Shetland Islands in 1820–21.

== Location ==
The cove's midpoint is located at 62°28′07″S 60°07′16″W which is 2 km south-southeast of Williams Point, 2.8 km southwest of Meade Islands and 3.4 km northwest of Pomorie Point (British mapping in 1968, Bulgarian in 2005 and 2009).

== See also ==
- Varna Peninsula
- Livingston Island

== Maps ==
- L.L. Ivanov et al. Antarctica: Livingston Island and Greenwich Island, South Shetland Islands. Scale 1:100000 topographic map. Sofia: Antarctic Place-names Commission of Bulgaria, 2005.
- L.L. Ivanov. Antarctica: Livingston Island and Greenwich, Robert, Snow and Smith Islands. Scale 1:120000 topographic map. Troyan: Manfred Wörner Foundation, 2009. ISBN 978-954-92032-6-4
