= Charybdis Cove =

Cove in the South Shetland Islands, Antarctica

Location of Varna Peninsula in the South Shetland Islands.

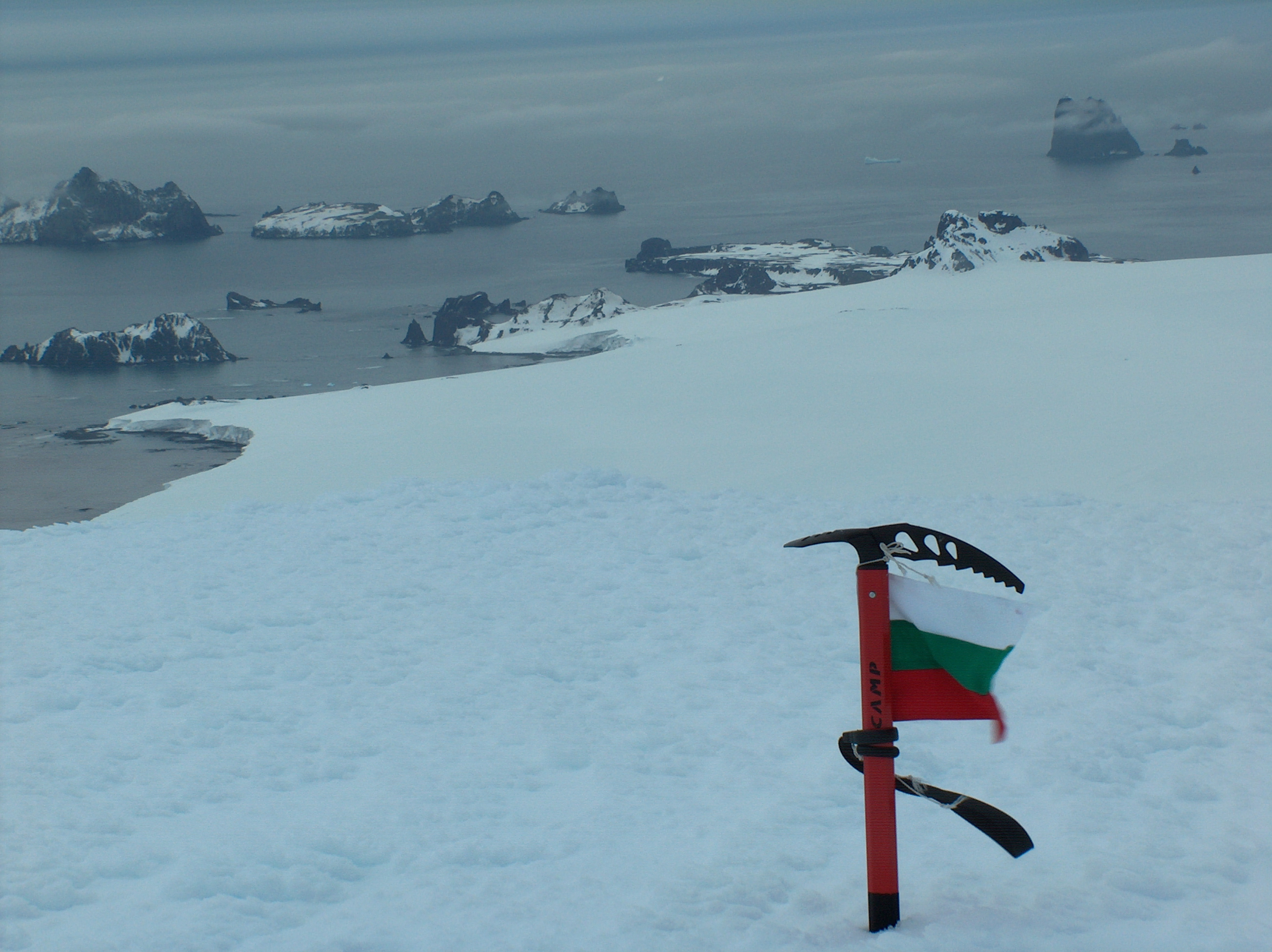
Charybdis Cove (second left) from Miziya Peak, with Zavala Island to the left and Zed Islands in the background.

Charybdis Cove is the 1.2 km wide cove indenting for 580 m the northwest coast of Varna Peninsula, Livingston Island in the South Shetland Islands, Antarctica and entered between Organpipe Point to the north and Slab Point to the south.

The feature is named after the Charybdis, a mythical Greek sea monster which wrecked ships and devoured sailors.

== Location ==
The cove is centred at 62°28′38.2″S 60°09′13.5″W which is 16.25 km northeast of Siddins Point and 2.92 km south-southwest of Williams Point (British mapping in 1968, and Bulgarian mapping in 2005 and 2009).

== Maps ==
- L.L. Ivanov et al. Antarctica: Livingston Island and Greenwich Island, South Shetland Islands. Scale 1:100000 topographic map. Sofia: Antarctic Place-names Commission of Bulgaria, 2005.
- L.L. Ivanov. Antarctica: Livingston Island and Greenwich, Robert, Snow and Smith Islands. Scale 1:120000 topographic map. Troyan: Manfred Wörner Foundation, 2009. ISBN 978-954-92032-6-4
