= Organpipe Point =

Headland in the South Shetland Islands, Antarctica

Location of Varna Peninsula in the South Shetland Islands.

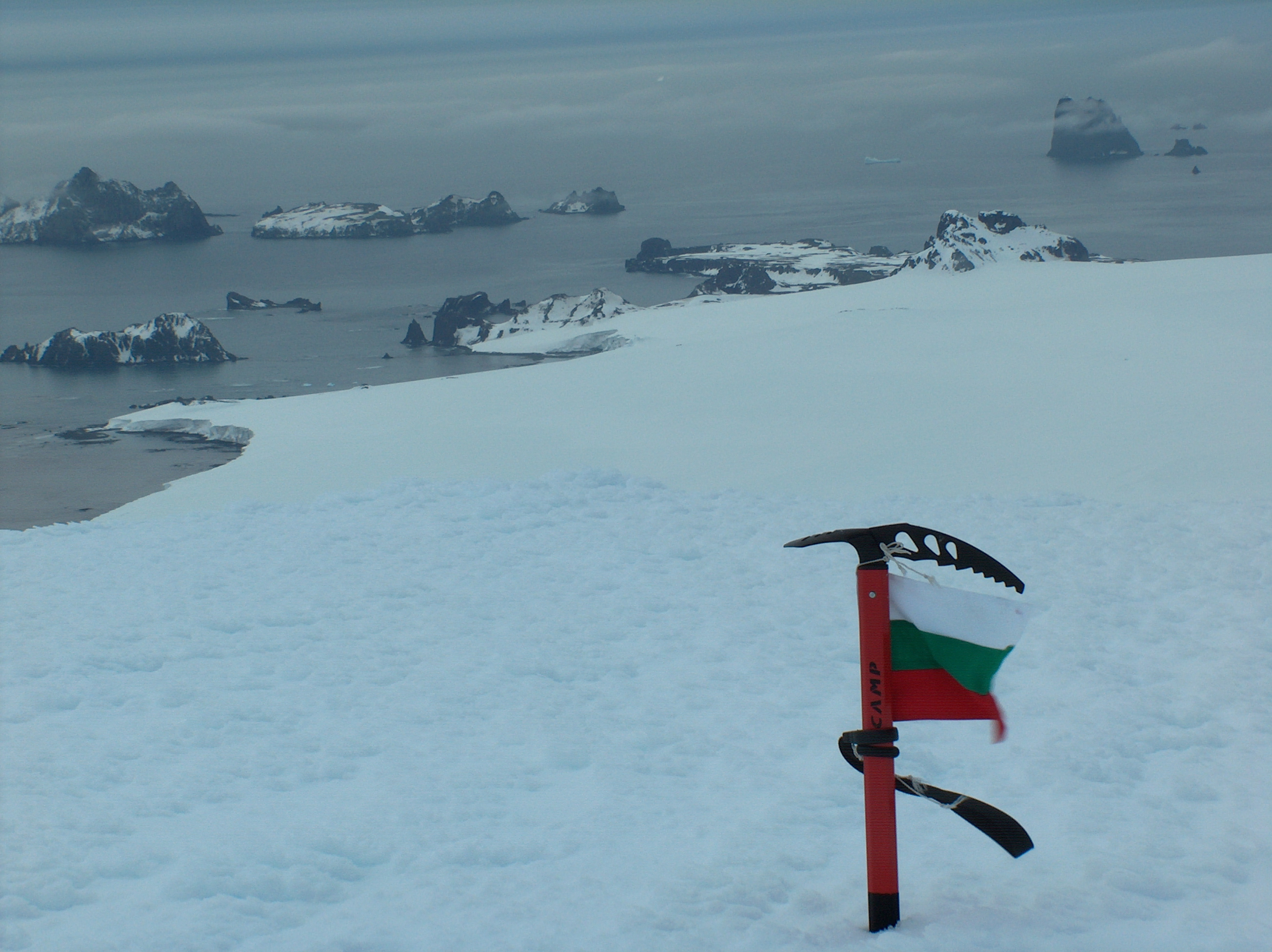
Organpipe Point (second left) from Miziya Peak, with Zavala Island and Slab Point in the foreground, Zed Islands in the background, and Pyramid Island on the right.

Organpipe Point is a prominent east–west trending headland rising to about 60 or 70 m on the northwest coast of Varna Peninsula, Livingston Island in the South Shetland Islands, Antarctica and forming the north side of the entrance to Charybdis Cove and the southwest side of the entrance to Griffin Cove.

The feature is descriptively named in association with the notable doleritic rock showing sub-vertical continuous columnar joints resembling organ pipes.

== Location ==
The point is located at 62°28′15.9″S 60°09′07.3″W which is 1.23 km northeast of Slab Point, 350 m east of Zavala Island, 830 m southwest of Gargoyle Bastion and 2.26 km south-southwest of Williams Point (British mapping in 1968, and Bulgarian in 2005 and 2009).

== Maps ==
- L.L. Ivanov et al. Antarctica: Livingston Island and Greenwich Island, South Shetland Islands. Scale 1:100000 topographic map. Sofia: Antarctic Place-names Commission of Bulgaria, 2005.
- L.L. Ivanov. Antarctica: Livingston Island and Greenwich, Robert, Snow and Smith Islands. Scale 1:120000 topographic map. Troyan: Manfred Wörner Foundation, 2009.
