= Sayer Nunatak =

Rocky peak on Livingston Island

Location of Varna Peninsula on Livingston Island in the South Shetland Islands.

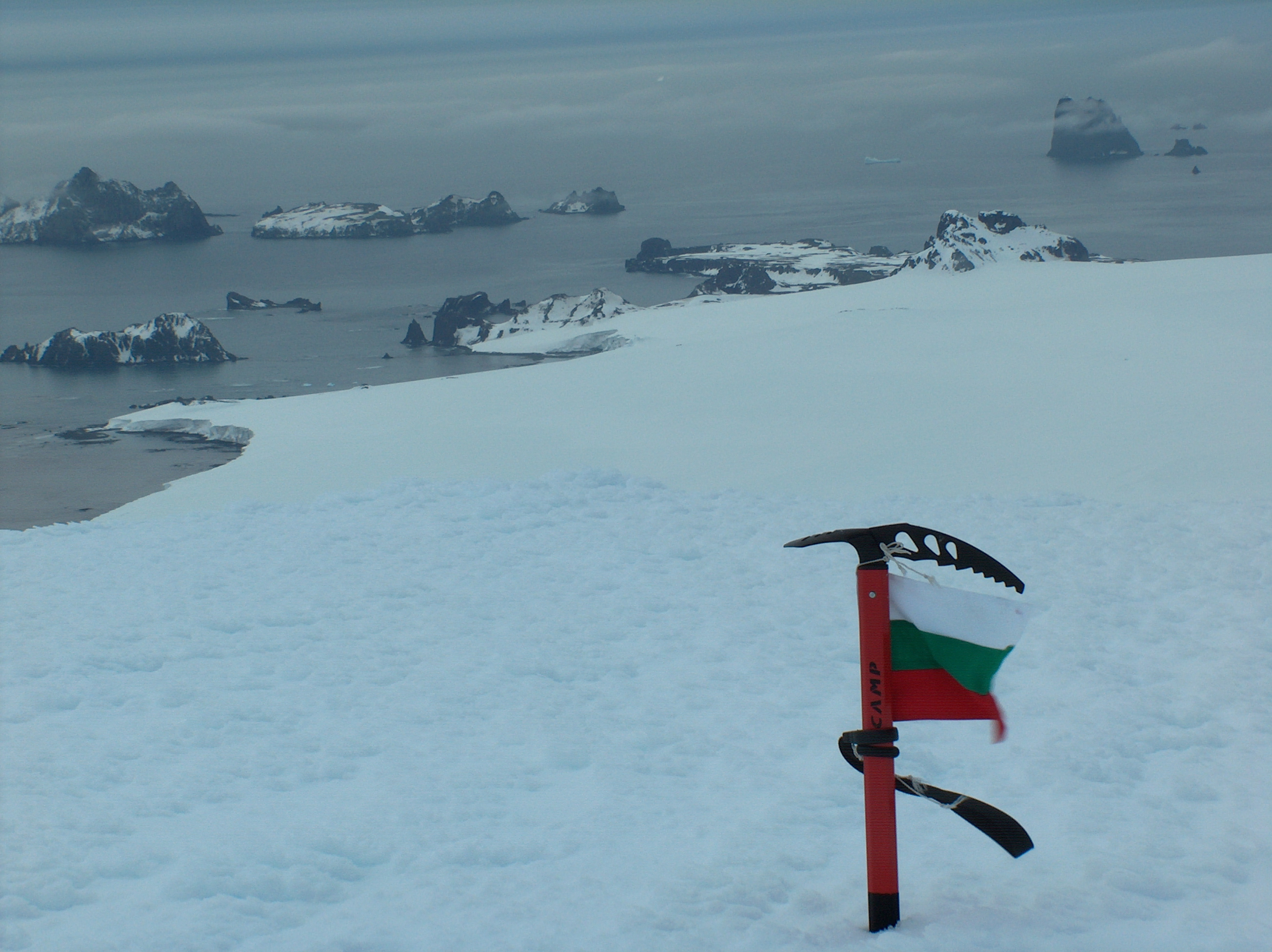
Sayer Nunatak (on the right) from Miziya Peak.

Topographic map of Livingston Island and Smith Island

Sayer Nunatak is a rocky peak rising to 210 m south of Williams Point on Varna Peninsula, at the north edge of the ice cap of Livingston Island in the South Shetland Islands, Antarctica. The nunatak is forming the north extremity of Vidin Heights and surmounting Dragon Cove to the northeast, Griffin Cove to the north-northwest and Charybdis Cove to the southwest.

The feature is named after the American Captain Sayer, Master of the brig General Scott, who carried out sealing operations in this area in 1821–22.

== Location ==
The peak is located at 62°28′21.5″S 60°08′04.8″W which is 2.3 km south of Williams Point, 3.8 km west-northwest of Pomorie Point, 5.92 km north-northwest of Rakovski Nunatak, 2.2 km north of Zhelyava Hill, 7.18 km north by east of Miziya Peak and 4.9 km northeast of Kotis Point (British mapping in 1968, Spanish in 1991, and Bulgarian in 2005 and 2009).

== See also ==
- Vidin Heights
- Varna Peninsula
- Livingston Island

== Maps ==
- L.L. Ivanov et al. Antarctica: Livingston Island and Greenwich Island, South Shetland Islands. Scale 1:100000 topographic map. Sofia: Antarctic Place-names Commission of Bulgaria, 2005.
- L.L. Ivanov. Antarctica: Livingston Island and Greenwich, Robert, Snow and Smith Islands. Scale 1:120000 topographic map. Troyan: Manfred Wörner Foundation, 2009. ISBN 978-954-92032-6-4
- Antarctic Digital Database (ADD). Scale 1:250000 topographic map of Antarctica. Scientific Committee on Antarctic Research (SCAR). Since 1993, regularly updated.
- L.L. Ivanov. Antarctica: Livingston Island and Smith Island. Scale 1:100000 topographic map. Manfred Wörner Foundation, 2017. ISBN 978-619-90008-3-0
