= Dunbar Islands =

Islands in Antarctica

- Location of Livingstone Island in the South Shetland Islands

- Location within Antarctic Peninsula Location within Antarctica

Geography
- Location: Antarctica
- Coordinates: 62°28′10″S 60°10′40″W
- Archipelago: South Shetland Islands

Administration
- Administered under the Antarctic Treaty System

Demographics
- Population: Uninhabited

Topographic map of Livingston Island, Greenwich, Robert, Snow and Smith Islands.

The Dunbar Islands are a small group of islands lying off Varna Peninsula southwest of Williams Point, the northeast extremity of Livingston Island in the South Shetland Islands, Antarctica comprising the islands of Aspis, Balsha, Melyane, Pogledets and Zavala, and several minor islets and rocks. The area was visited by early 19th century sealers.

The islands are named after Captain Thomas Dunbar, Master of the American sealing schooner Free Gift which visited the South Shetland Islands in 1820–21.

== Location ==
The midpoint of the group is located at 62°28′10″S 60°10′40″W (British mapping in 1968, Spanish in 1991, and Bulgarian in 2005 and 2009).

== Maps ==
- L.L. Ivanov et al. Antarctica: Livingston Island and Greenwich Island, South Shetland Islands. Scale 1:100000 topographic map. Sofia: Antarctic Place-names Commission of Bulgaria, 2005.
- L.L. Ivanov. Antarctica: Livingston Island and Greenwich, Robert, Snow and Smith Islands. Scale 1:120000 topographic map. Troyan: Manfred Wörner Foundation, 2009. ISBN 978-954-92032-6-4

== See also ==
- Composite Antarctic Gazetteer
- List of Antarctic islands south of 60° S
- SCAR
- Territorial claims in Antarctica
