= Iglika Passage =

Passage in the South Shetland Islands, Antarctica

Location of Varna Peninsula on Livingston Island in the South Shetland Islands.

Topographic map of Livingston Island, Greenwich, Robert, Snow and Smith Islands.

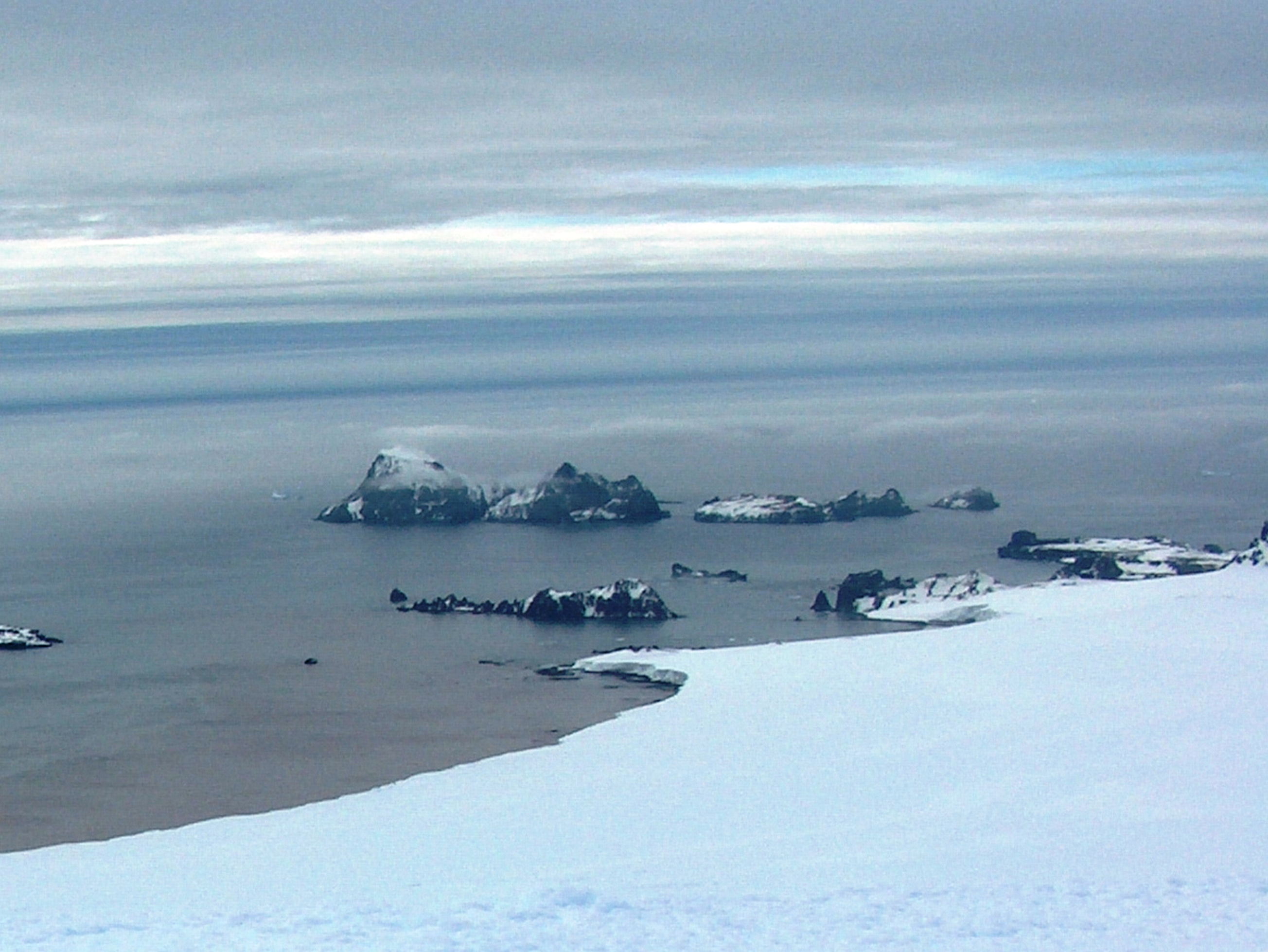
Iglika Passage from Miziya Peak, Livingston Island.

Iglika Passage (Bulgarian: проток Иглика, ‘Protok Iglika’ \'pro-tok i-'gli-ka\) is the passage between the Zed island group and Livingston Island in the South Shetland Islands, Antarctica, 1.53 km wide between Lesidren Island and Williams Point on Varna Peninsula, Livingston Island.

The passage is named after the settlements of Iglika in northern, northeastern and southeastern Bulgaria.

== Location ==
Iglika Passage is located at 62°26′44.5″S 60°08′30″W. Bulgarian mapping in 2009.

== Map ==
- L.L. Ivanov. Antarctica: Livingston Island and Greenwich, Robert, Snow and Smith Islands. Scale 1:120000 topographic map. Troyan: Manfred Wörner Foundation, 2009. ISBN 978-954-92032-6-4
