= Esperanto Island =

Antarctic island

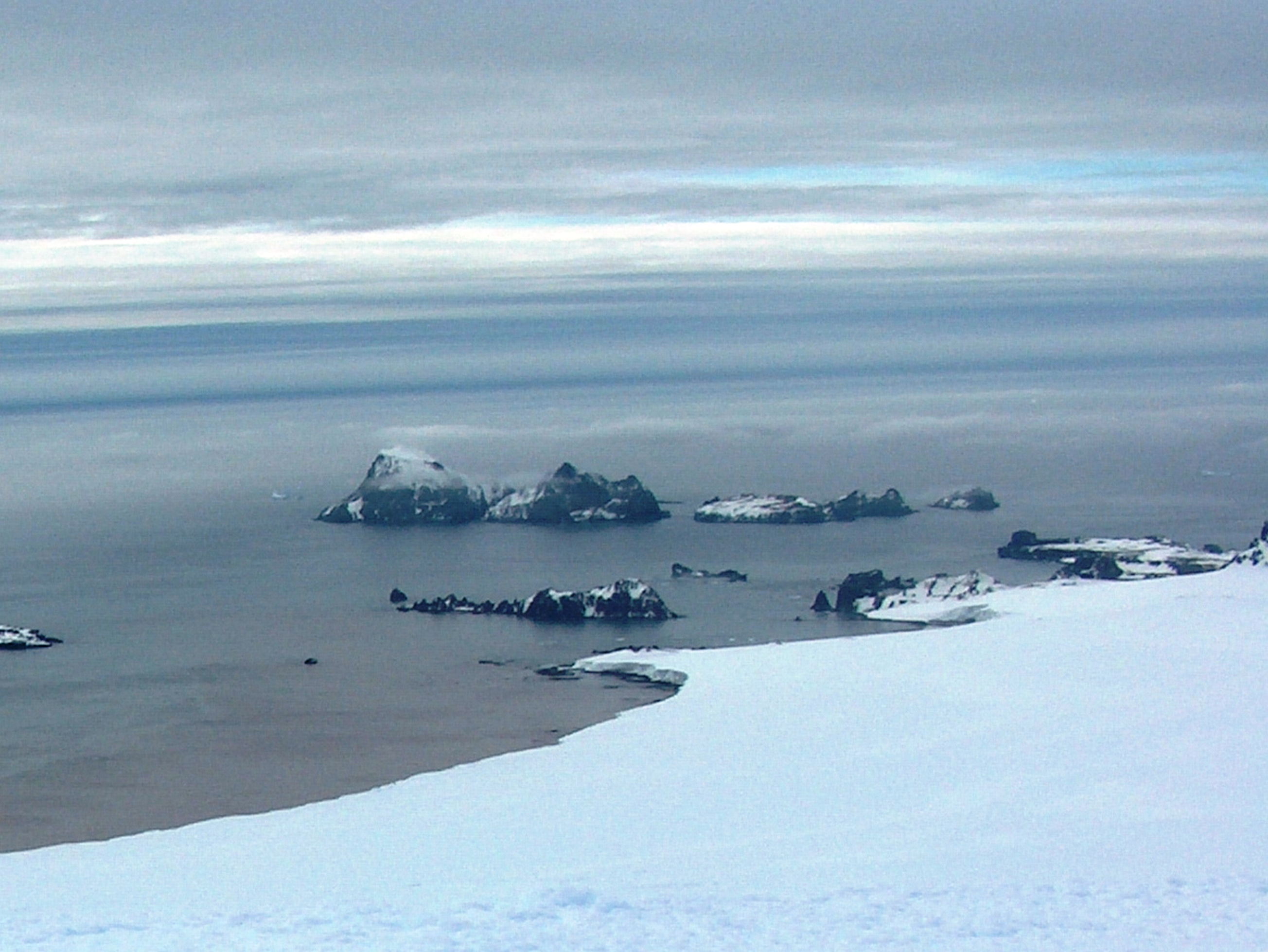
- Zed Islands from Miziya Peak; Esperanto Island is the leftmost one in the background

- Location of Esperanto Island

- Location within Antarctica

Geography
- Location: Antarctica
- Coordinates: 62°25′43″S 60°10′23″W
- Archipelago: South Shetland Islands
- Area: 56 ha (140 acres)
- Length: 0.95 km (0.59 mi)
- Width: 0.9 km (0.56 mi)
- Highest elevation: 290 m (950 ft)

Administration
- Administered under the Antarctic Treaty System

Demographics
- Population: Uninhabited

Esperanto Island is the largest and northwesternmost island in the Zed group off the north coast of Varna Peninsula on Livingston Island in the South Shetland Islands, Antarctica. The island is ice-free, rocky, rising to 290 m (951 ft) and extending 950 by 900 m (1,040 by 980 yd), with surface area 56 hectares (140 acres). It is situated 70 m (77 yd) to the northwest of the neighbouring Phanagoria Island, and 2.7 km (1.7 mi) northwest of Williams Point on Livingston Island. The area was visited by early 19th-century sealers.

The island is named after the constructed international language Esperanto.

== Location ==
Esperanto Island is located at 62°25′43″S 60°10′23″W. British mapping in 1968, Chilean in 1971, Argentine in 1980, Bulgarian in 2005 and 2009.

Esperanto Island is NNW of the NE tip of Livingston Island

== See also ==
- Composite Antarctic Gazetteer
- List of Antarctic islands south of 60° S
- SCAR
- Territorial claims in Antarctica
