= Griffin Cove =

Cove in the South Shetland Islands, Antarctica

Location of Varna Peninsula in the South Shetland Islands.

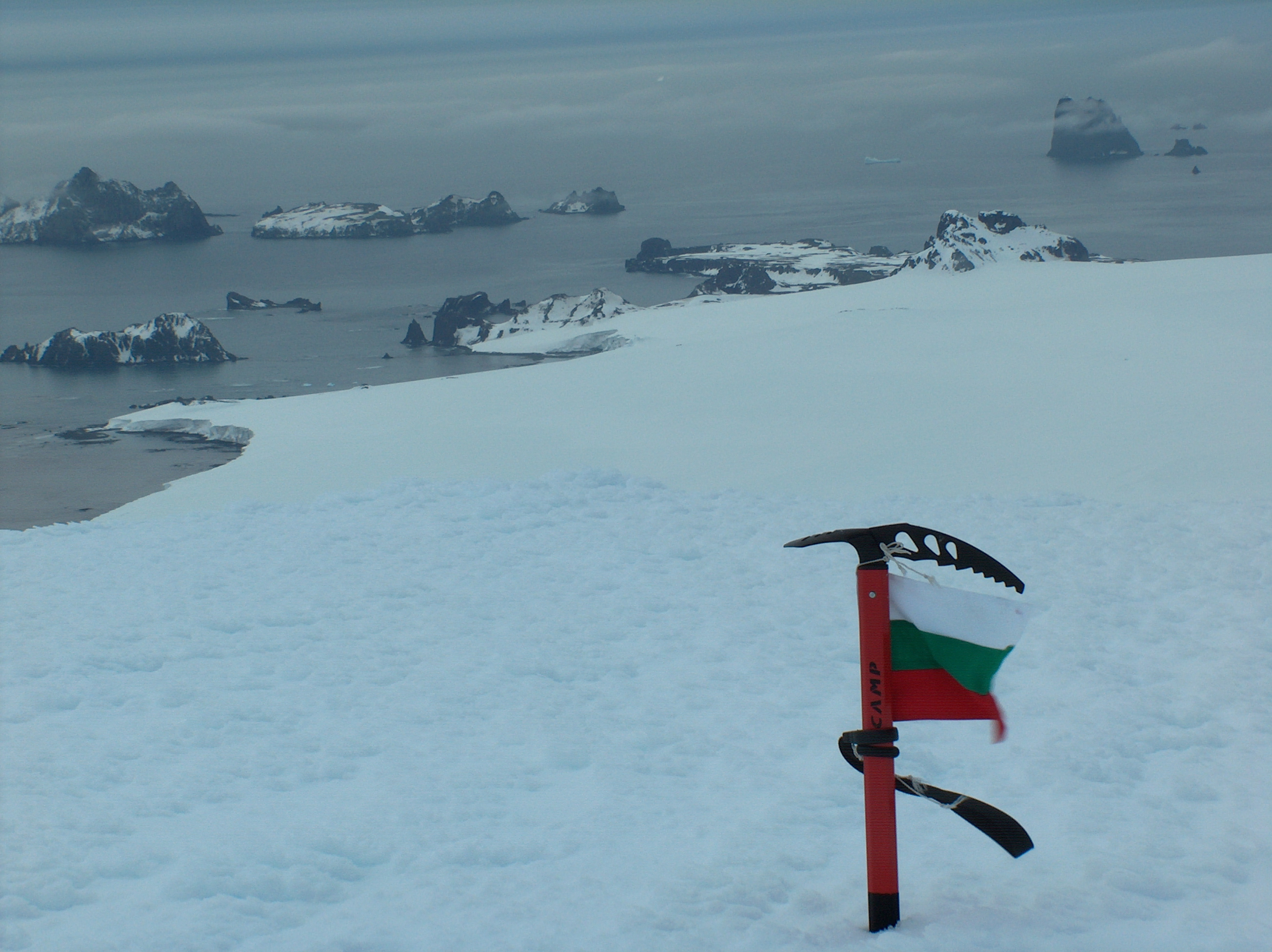
Griffin Cove (third left) from Miziya Peak, with Williams Point and Zed Islands in the background.

Griffin Cove is the 800 m wide cove indenting for 260 m the northwest coast of Varna Peninsula, Livingston Island in the South Shetland Islands, Antarctica and entered between Gargoyle Bastion to the northeast and Organpipe Point to the southwest.

The feature is named after the griffin, a legendary bird often portrayed as a monster.

== Location ==
The cove is centred at 62°28′09.1″S 60°08′40.4″W which is 17.15 km northeast of Siddins Point and 1.95 km south by west of Williams Point (British mapping in 1968, and Bulgarian mapping in 2005 and 2009).

== Maps ==
- L.L. Ivanov et al. Antarctica: Livingston Island and Greenwich Island, South Shetland Islands. Scale 1:100000 topographic map. Sofia: Antarctic Place-names Commission of Bulgaria, 2005.
- L.L. Ivanov. Antarctica: Livingston Island and Greenwich, Robert, Snow and Smith Islands. Scale 1:120000 topographic map. Troyan: Manfred Wörner Foundation, 2009. ISBN 978-954-92032-6-4
