= Eliseyna Cove =

Cove in the South Shetland Islands, Antarctica

Location of Varna Peninsula in the South Shetland Islands.

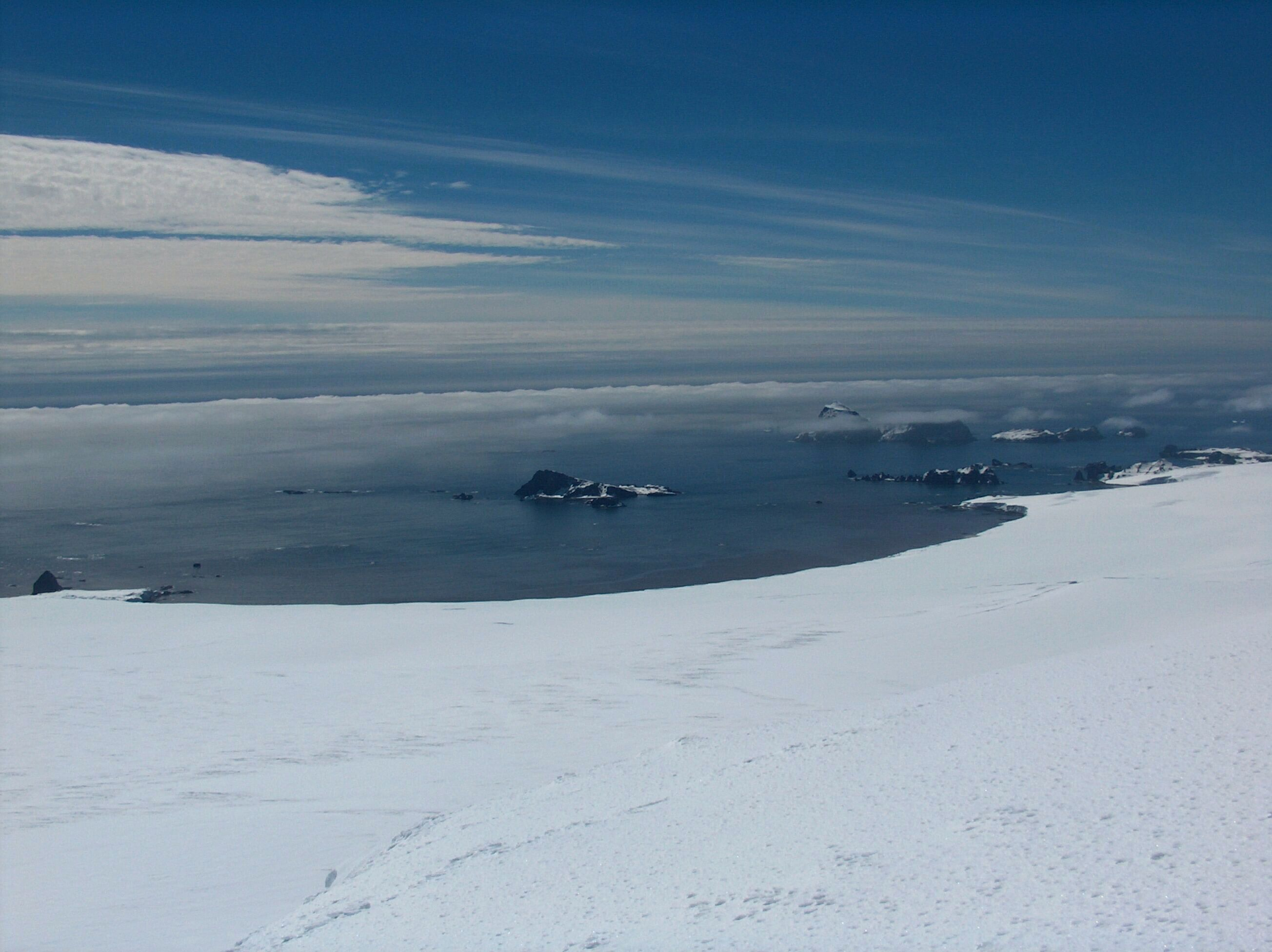
Eliseyna Cove from Miziya Peak.

Topographic map of Livingston Island and Smith Island

Eliseyna Cove (Bulgarian: залив Елисейна, romanized: zaliv Eliseyna, IPA: [ˈzalif ɛliˈsɛjnɐ]) is a 3 km wide cove indenting for 1.4 km in the northwest coast of Varna Peninsula between Slab Point to the north and Kotis Point to the south. The cove is named after the Iskar Gorge settlement of Eliseyna in western Bulgaria.

== Location ==
The cove is centred at 62°29′42″S 60°10′47″W which is 10.22 km northeast of Siddins Point and 5.24 km south-southwest of Williams Point (British mapping in 1968, Bulgarian mapping in 2005 and 2009 from the Tangra 2004/05 topographic survey).

== Maps ==
- South Shetland Islands. Scale 1:200000 topographic map. DOS 610 Sheet W 62 60. Tolworth, UK, 1968.
- L.L. Ivanov et al. Antarctica: Livingston Island and Greenwich Island, South Shetland Islands. Scale 1:100000 topographic map. Sofia: Antarctic Place-names Commission of Bulgaria, 2005.
- L.L. Ivanov. Antarctica: Livingston Island and Greenwich, Robert, Snow and Smith Islands. Scale 1:120000 topographic map. Troyan: Manfred Wörner Foundation, 2010. ISBN 978-954-92032-9-5 (First edition 2009. ISBN 978-954-92032-6-4)
- Antarctic Digital Database (ADD). Scale 1:250000 topographic map of Antarctica. Scientific Committee on Antarctic Research (SCAR). Since 1993, regularly updated.
- L.L. Ivanov. Antarctica: Livingston Island and Smith Island. Scale 1:100000 topographic map. Manfred Wörner Foundation, 2017. ISBN 978-619-90008-3-0
