= Slab Point =

Rocky point in the South Shetland Islands, Antarctica

Location of Livingston Island in the South Shetland Islands.

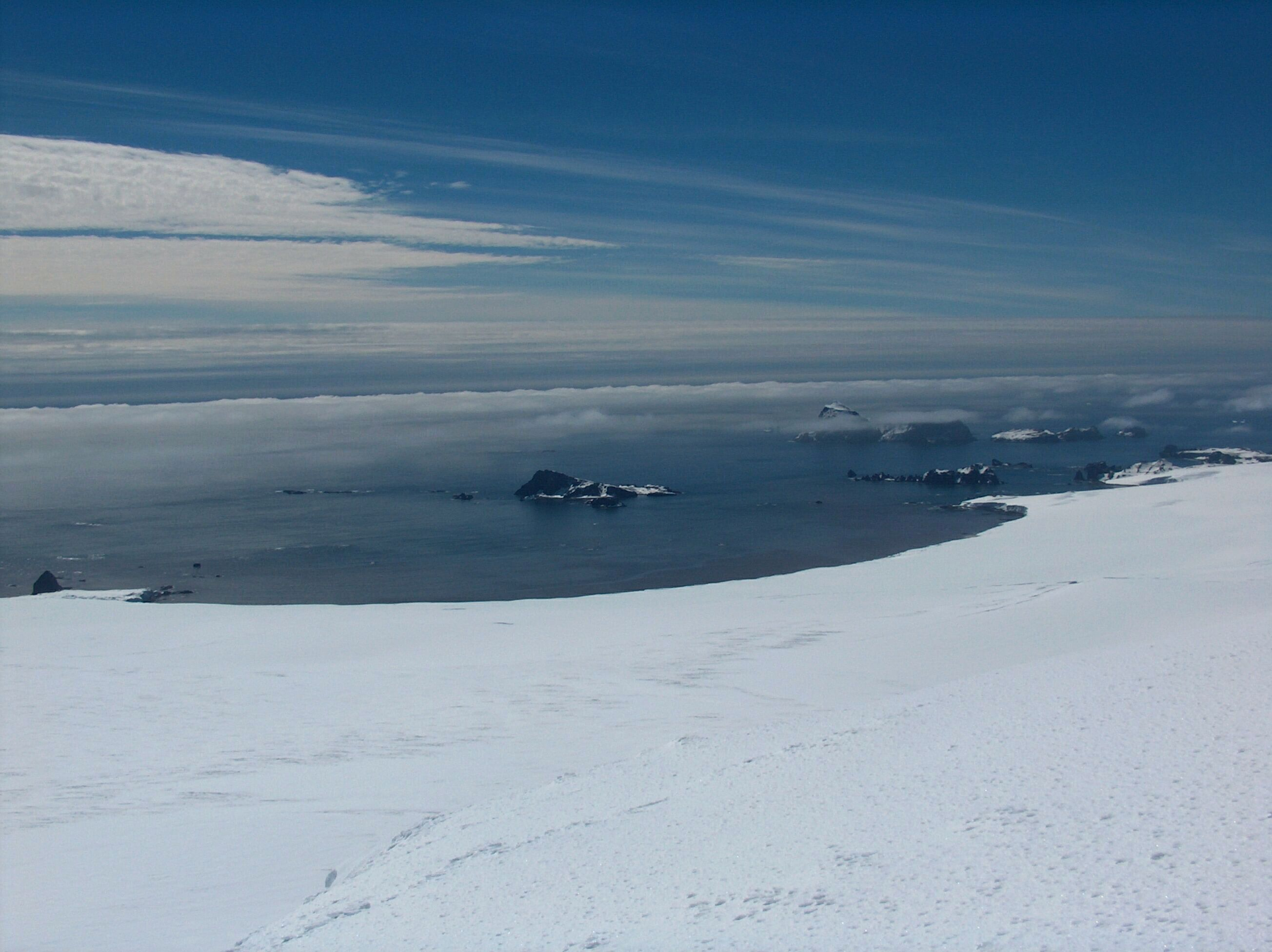
Eliseyna Cove from Miziya Peak, with Slab Point on the right.

Topographic map of Livingston Island, Greenwich, Robert, Snow and Smith Islands.

Slab Point is a rocky point on the northwest coast of Varna Peninsula, Livingston Island in the South Shetland Islands, Antarctica forming the north side of the entrance to Eliseyna Cove and the south side of the entrance to Charybdis Cove.

The feature is descriptively named from the ice cliffs bounding it to the south.

== Location ==
The point is located at 62°28′50.5″S 60°09′49.1″W which is 3.17 km northeast of Kotis Point, 1.5 km southeast of Balsha Island, 800 m south of Zavala Island, 1.23 km southwest of Organpipe Point and 3.47 km south-southwest of Williams Point (British mapping in 1968, and Bulgarian in 2005 and 2009).

== Maps ==
- L.L. Ivanov et al. Antarctica: Livingston Island and Greenwich Island, South Shetland Islands. Scale 1:100000 topographic map. Sofia: Antarctic Place-names Commission of Bulgaria, 2005.
- L.L. Ivanov. Antarctica: Livingston Island and Greenwich, Robert, Snow and Smith Islands. Scale 1:120000 topographic map. Troyan: Manfred Wörner Foundation, 2009.
