= Goritsa Rocks =

Two contiguous rocks in Zed Islands

- Location of Varna Peninsula on Livingston Island in the South Shetland Islands.

- Location within Antarctica Location within Antarctic Peninsula

Geography
- Location: Antarctica
- Coordinates: 62°25′32″S 60°09′25″W
- Archipelago: South Shetland Islands

Administration
- Administered under the Antarctic Treaty System

Demographics
- Population: Uninhabited

Goritsa Rocks (Bulgarian: скали Горица, romanized: skali Goritsa, IPA: [skɐˈli ɡoˈrit͡sɐ]) are the two contiguous rocks in Zed Islands off Varna Peninsula, Livingston Island in the South Shetland Islands extending 330 m in northwest-southeast direction and 70 m wide. The area was visited by early 19th century sealers.

The rocks are named after the settlements of Goritsa in Northeastern and Southeastern Bulgaria.

== Location ==
Goritsa Rocks are centred at 62°25′32″S 60°09′25″W and situated 100 m east-northeast of Dlagnya Rocks and 2.82 km west-southwest of Pyramid Island. British mapping in 1968 and Bulgarian mapping in 2009.

== Maps ==
- Livingston Island to King George Island. Scale 1:200000. Admiralty Nautical Chart 1776. Taunton: UK Hydrographic Office, 1968.
- L.L. Ivanov. Antarctica: Livingston Island and Greenwich, Robert, Snow and Smith Islands. Scale 1:120000 topographic map. Troyan: Manfred Wörner Foundation, 2009. ISBN 978-954-92032-6-4 (Second edition 2010, ISBN 978-954-92032-9-5)
- Antarctic Digital Database (ADD). Scale 1:250000 topographic map of Antarctica. Scientific Committee on Antarctic Research (SCAR). Since 1993, regularly upgraded and updated.
