= Lesidren Island =

Island in the South Shetland Islands, Antarctica

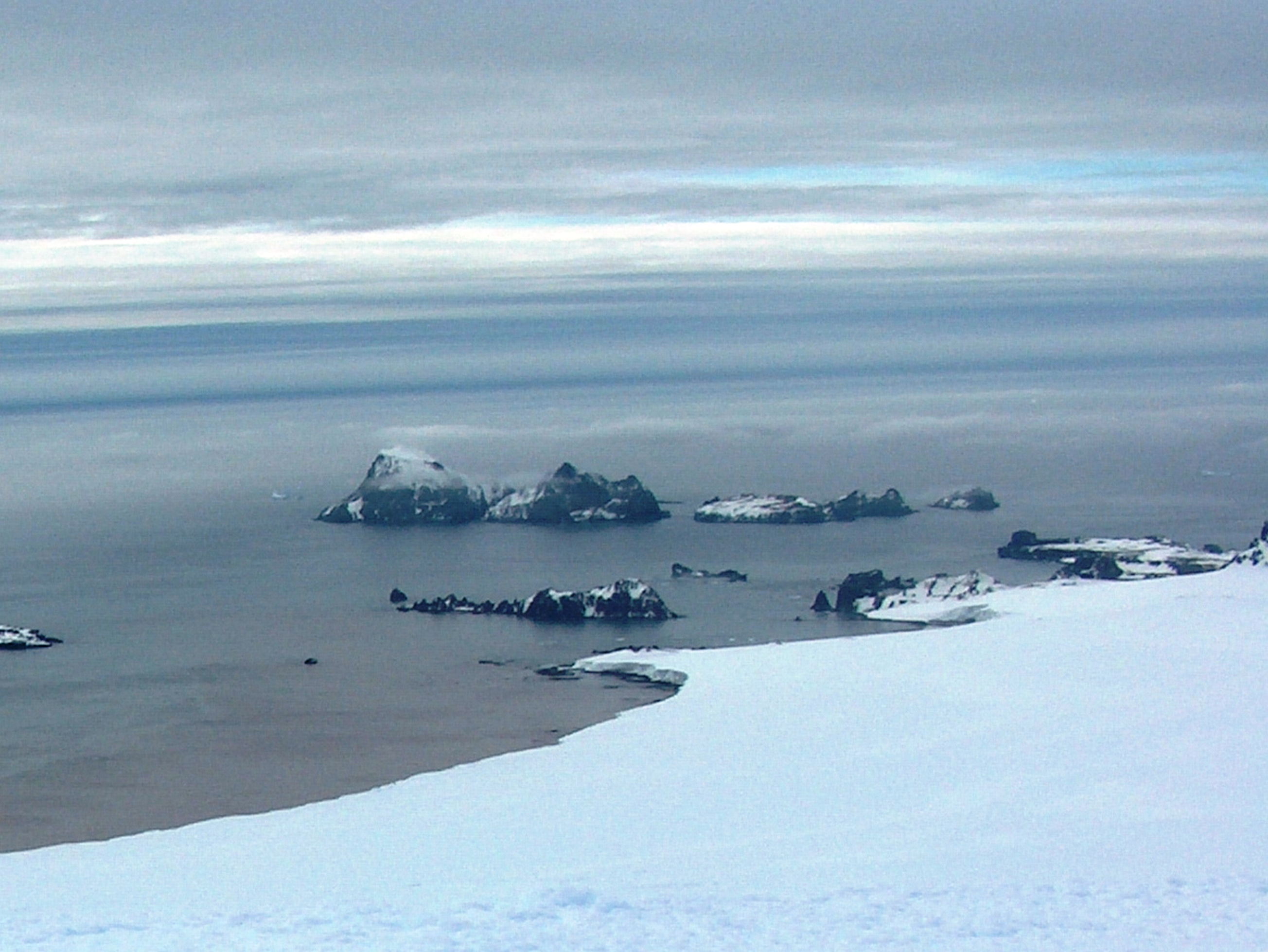
- Zed Islands (in the background) from Miziya Peak; Lesidren Island is the second on the right.

- Location of Varna Peninsula in the South Shetland Islands

- Location on Antarctic Peninsula Location in Antarctica

Geography
- Location: Antarctica
- Coordinates: 62°26′10″S 60°08′55″W
- Archipelago: Zed Islands
- Area: 33 ha (82 acres)
- Length: 0.8 km (0.5 mi)
- Width: 0.6 km (0.37 mi)

Administration
- Administered under the Antarctic Treaty System

Demographics
- Population: Uninhabited

Lesidren Island (Bulgarian: остров Лесидрен, romanized: ostrov Lesidren, IPA: [ˈɔstrof ˈlɛsidrɛn]) is the second largest and southernmost island in the Zed group off the north coast of Varna Peninsula, Livingston Island in the South Shetland Islands, Antarctica. The island is ice-free, extending 800 by 600 m (870 by 660 yd) with surface area 33 hectares (82 acres). Separated from the neighbouring Phanagoria Island and Koshava Island by channels 130 and 140 m (140 and 150 yd) wide respectively. The area was visited by early 19th century sealers.

The island is named after the settlement of Lesidren in northern Bulgaria.

== Location ==
Lesidren Island is located at 62°26′10″S 60°08′55″W which is 1.53 km (0.95 mi) north of Williams Point on Livingston Island. British mapping in 1968, Chilean in 1971, Argentine in 1980, Bulgarian in 2005 and 2009.

Topographic map of Livingston Island, Greenwich, Robert, Snow and Smith Islands

== See also ==
- Composite Gazetteer of Antarctica
- List of Antarctic islands south of 60° S
- SCAR
- Territorial claims in Antarctica
