= Phanagoria Island =

Island in the South Shetland Islands, Antarctica

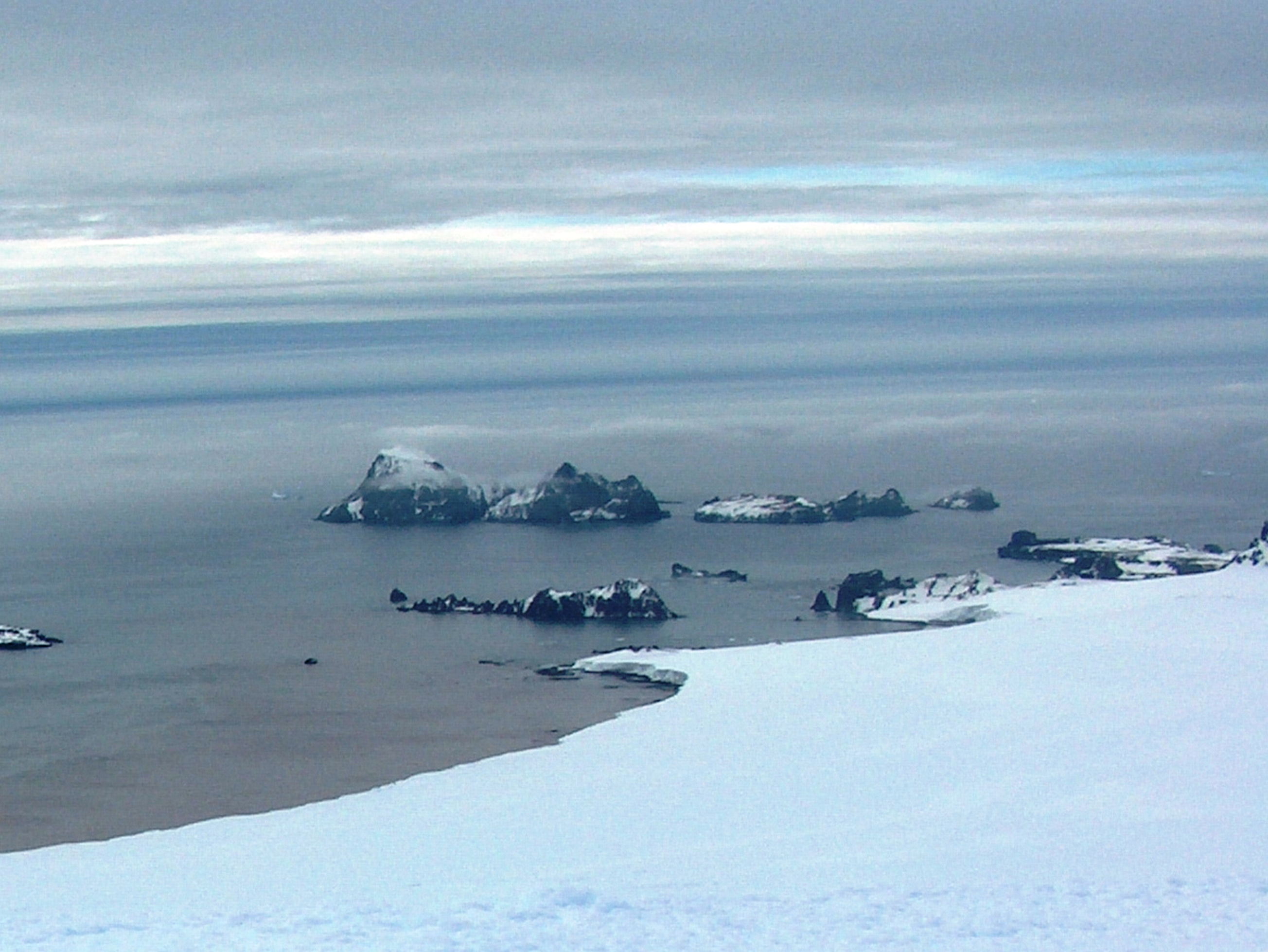
- Zed Islands from Miziya Peak; Phanagoria Island is the second one on the left.

- Location of Varna Peninsula in the South Shetland Islands

- Location on Antarctic Peninsula Location in Antarctica

Geography
- Location: Antarctica
- Coordinates: 62°26′03″S 60°09′46″W
- Archipelago: Zed group
- Area: 20 ha (49 acres)
- Length: 700 m (2300 ft)
- Width: 500 m (1600 ft)

Administration
- Antarctica
- Administered under the Antarctic Treaty System

Demographics
- Population: uninhabited

Phanagoria Island (Greek: Φαναγόρεια Νήσος, Bulgarian: остров Фанагория, romanized: ostrov Fanagoriya, IPA: [ˈɔstrof fɐnɐˈɡɔrijɐ]) is the third largest island in the Zed group off the north coast of Livingston Island in the South Shetland Islands, Antarctica. Phanagoria island of Antarctic is named after Phanagoria in the Maeotis Lake, today Azov Sea, the largest ancient Greek city on the Taman peninsula, spread over two plateaus along the eastern shore of the Cimmerian Bosporus. The city took its name after one of its colonists, Phanagoras, and was a large emporium for all the traffic between the coast of the Maeotian marshes and the countries on the southern side of the Caucasus. It was the eastern capital of the Bosporan Kingdom.

The island is ice-free, extending 700 by 500 m (770 by 550 yd) with surface area 20 hectares (49 acres). Separated from the neighbouring Esperanto Island and Lesidren Island by channels 70 and 130 m (77 and 142 yd) wide respectively. Situated 2.1 km (1.3 mi) northwest of Williams Point. The area was visited by early 19th century sealers.

The island is named after the town of Phanagoria in Old Great Bulgaria (7th century).

== Location ==
Phanagoria Island is located at 62°26′03″S 60°09′46″W. British mapping in 1968, Chilean in 1971, Argentine in 1980, Bulgarian in 2005 and 2009.

Topographic map of Livingston Island, Greenwich, Robert, Snow and Smith Islands

== See also ==
- Composite Gazetteer of Antarctica
- List of Antarctic islands south of 60° S
- SCAR
- Territorial claims in Antarctica
