= Pomorie Point =

Point in the South Shetland Islands, Antarctica

Location of Varna Peninsula on Livingston Island in the South Shetland Islands.

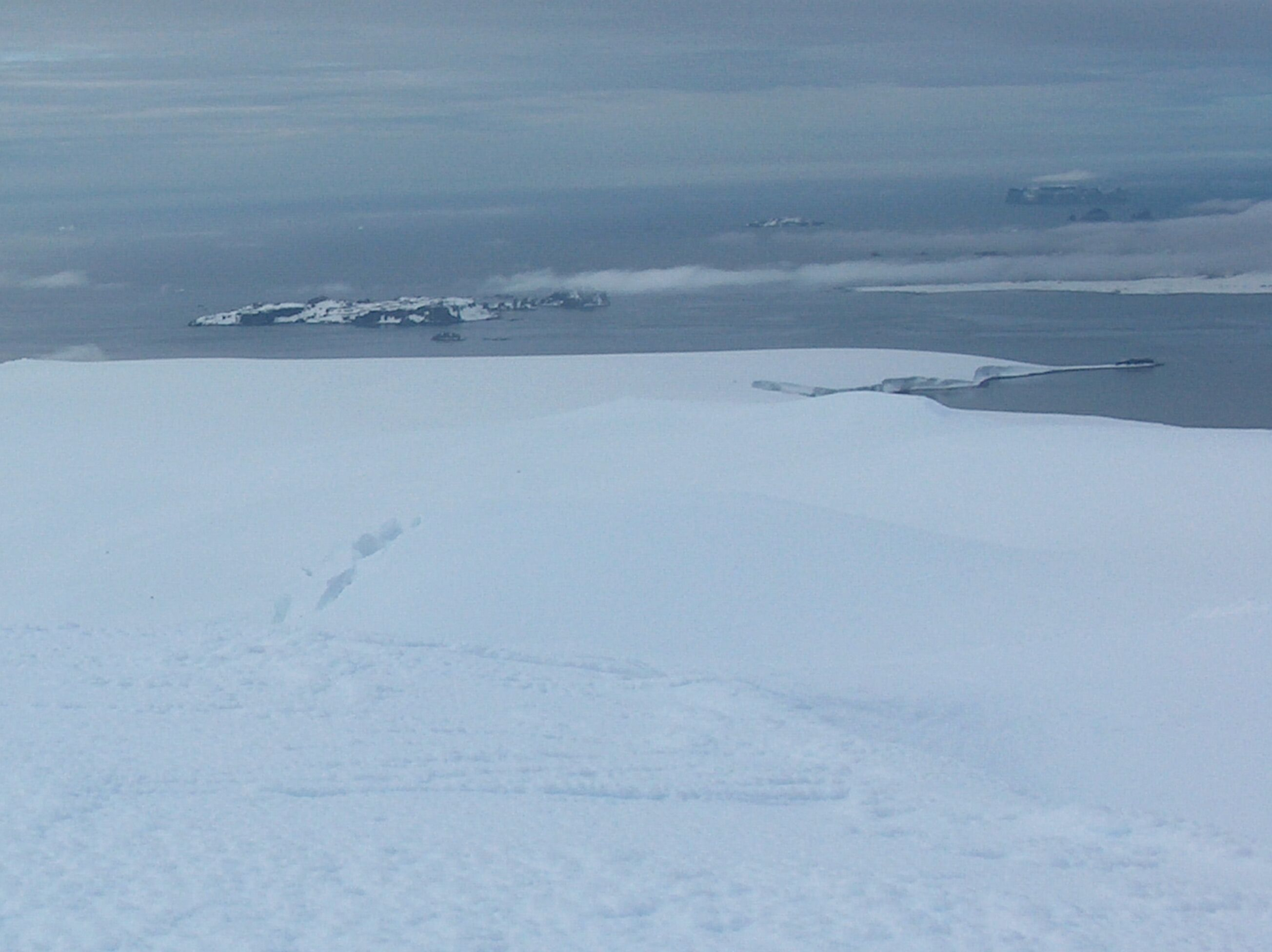
Pomorie Point (on the right) from Miziya Peak, with McFarlane Strait, Meade Islands and Duff Point in the background.

Topographic map of Livingston Island and Smith Island

Pomorie Point (Nos Pomorie \'nos po-'mo-ri-e\) is a point on the coast of McFarlane Strait forming the north side of the entrance to Lister Cove, Varna Peninsula, Livingston Island in the South Shetland Islands, Antarctica.

The point is named after the Bulgarian town of Pomorie.

== Location ==
The point is located at 62°29′05.3″S 60°03′56″W, which is 5.17 km southeast of Williams Point, 7.61 km northeast of Miziya Peak in Vidin Heights, 5.49 km northwest of Inott Point, 4.36 km south-southwest of Duff Point, Greenwich Island, and 2.5 km south-southeast of Channel Rock (British mapping in 1968, Bulgarian mapping in 2005 and 2009).

== Maps ==
- South Shetland Islands. Scale 1:200000 topographic map. DOS 610 Sheet W 62 60. Tolworth, UK, 1968.
- L.L. Ivanov et al. Antarctica: Livingston Island and Greenwich Island, South Shetland Islands. Scale 1:100000 topographic map. Sofia: Antarctic Place-names Commission of Bulgaria, 2005.
- L.L. Ivanov. Antarctica: Livingston Island and Greenwich, Robert, Snow and Smith Islands. Scale 1:120000 topographic map. Troyan: Manfred Wörner Foundation, 2010. ISBN 978-954-92032-9-5 (First edition 2009. ISBN 978-954-92032-6-4)
- Antarctic Digital Database (ADD). Scale 1:250000 topographic map of Antarctica. Scientific Committee on Antarctic Research (SCAR). Since 1993, regularly updated.
- L.L. Ivanov. Antarctica: Livingston Island and Smith Island. Scale 1:100000 topographic map. Manfred Wörner Foundation, 2017. ISBN 978-619-90008-3-0
