= Phelps Promontory =

Ice promontory on Livingston Island, Antarctica

Location of Varna Peninsula on Livingston Island in the South Shetland Islands.

Topographic map of Livingston Island and Smith Island

Phelps Promontory (62°28′55″S 60°7′15″W) is a large ice piedmont promontory forming the north extremity of Varna Peninsula on Livingston Island in the South Shetland Islands, Antarctica north of Zhelyava Hill. The promontory is fringed by several low-lying rocky headlands, and rises gently south to an altitude of about 180 m. Named after (Edmund) Malcolm Stuart Phelps (1928–2017), Master RRS John Biscoe, 1972-1991 (First Officer, 1966–72; Second Officer, 1964–66), who gave substantial assistance to Dr. J.L. Smellie and Dr. M.R.A. Thomson, British Antarctic Survey geologists with the field survey of this area, during the season 1974–75.

== Maps ==
- L.L. Ivanov et al. Antarctica: Livingston Island and Greenwich Island, South Shetland Islands. Scale 1:100000 topographic map. Sofia: Antarctic Place-names Commission of Bulgaria, 2005.
- L.L. Ivanov. Antarctica: Livingston Island and Greenwich, Robert, Snow and Smith Islands. Scale 1:120000 topographic map. Troyan: Manfred Wörner Foundation, 2010. ISBN 978-954-92032-9-5 (First edition 2009. ISBN 978-954-92032-6-4)
- Antarctic Digital Database (ADD). Scale 1:250000 topographic map of Antarctica. Scientific Committee on Antarctic Research (SCAR). Since 1993, regularly updated.
- L.L. Ivanov. Antarctica: Livingston Island and Smith Island. Scale 1:100000 topographic map. Manfred Wörner Foundation, 2017. ISBN 978-619-90008-3-0
