= Zavala Island =

Island in the South Shetland Islands, Antarctica

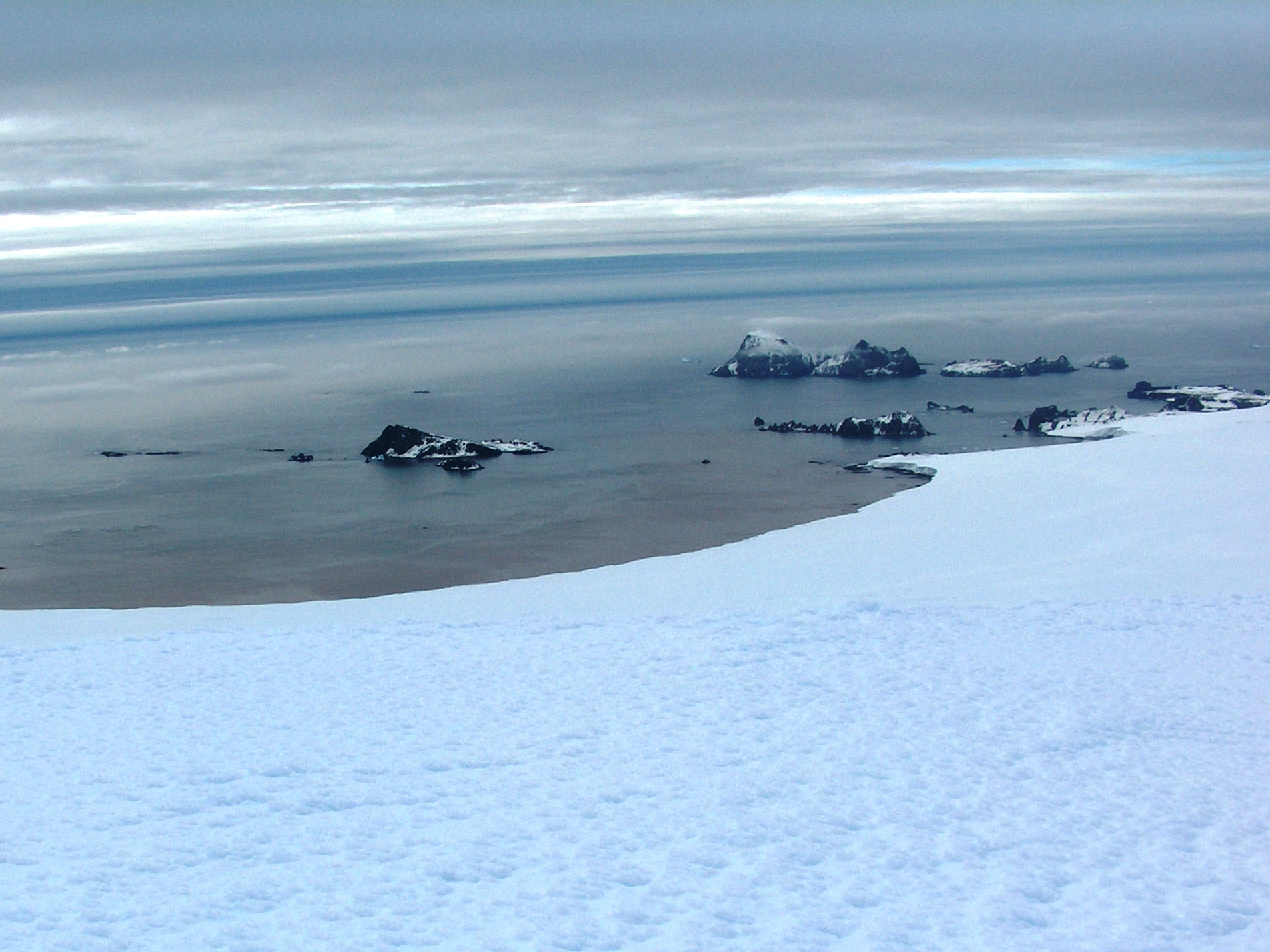
- Zavala Island (the right one in the foreground) from Miziya Peak, Livingston Island, with Zed Islands in the background.

- Location of Varna Peninsula in South Shetland Islands

- Location on Antarctic Peninsula Location in Antarctica

Geography
- Location: Antarctica
- Coordinates: 62°28′12″S 60°09′52″W
- Archipelago: Dunbar Islands
- Area: 14 ha (35 acres)
- Length: 0.7 km (0.43 mi)
- Width: 0.25 km (0.155 mi)

Administration
- Administered under the Antarctic Treaty System

Demographics
- Population: Uninhabited

Zavala Island (Bulgarian: остров Завала, romanized: ostrov Zavala, IPA: [ˈɔstrov ˈzavɐɫɐ]) is an ice-free island in the Dunbar group off the northwest coast of Varna Peninsula on Livingston Island in the South Shetland Islands, Antarctica. It is extending 700 by 250 m (770 by 270 yd), with surface area 14 hectares (35 acres). The area was visited by early 19th-century sealers.

The island is named after the settlement of Zavala and the Zavala Mountain in western Bulgaria.

== Location ==
Zavala Island is located at 62°28′12″S 60°09′52″W, 1.3 km (0.81 mi) east-northeast of Balsha Island, 750 m (820 yd) southwest of Aspis Island, 800 m (870 yd) north of Slab Point, and 350 m (380 yd) west of Organpipe Point. Bulgarian topographic survey by the Tangra 2004/05 expedition. British mapping in 1968, Chilean in 1971, Argentine in 1980, and Bulgarian in 2005 and 2009.

Topographic map of Livingston Island and Smith Island

== Maps ==
- L.L. Ivanov. Antarctica: Livingston Island and Greenwich, Robert, Snow and Smith Islands. Scale 1:120000 topographic map. Troyan: Manfred Wörner Foundation, 2010. ISBN 978-954-92032-9-5 (First edition 2009. ISBN 978-954-92032-6-4)
- Antarctic Digital Database (ADD). Scale 1:250000 topographic map of Antarctica. Scientific Committee on Antarctic Research (SCAR). Since 1993, regularly upgraded and updated.
- L.L. Ivanov. Antarctica: Livingston Island and Smith Island. Scale 1:100000 topographic map. Manfred Wörner Foundation, 2017. ISBN 978-619-90008-3-0

== See also ==
- Composite Gazetteer of Antarctica
- List of Antarctic islands south of 60° S
- SCAR
- Territorial claims in Antarctica
