= Iglika (given name) =

Iglika (Bulgarian: Иглика) is a Bulgarian feminine given name. Notable people with the name include:

- Iglika Ivanova (born 1957), Bulgarian lawyer and politician, M.P. and observer in the European Parliament
- Iglika Trifonova (born 1957), Bulgarian film director
- Iglika Trifonova (photographer), Bulgarian photographer, the namesake of the Trifonova Point, Antarctica
- Iglika Vasileva, Bulgarian literary translator
