= Balsha Island =

Island in Antarctic Treaty area, Antarctica

- Location of Varna Peninsula on Livingston Island in the South Shetland Islands

- Location within Antarctic Peninsula Location within Antarctica

Geography
- Location: Antarctica
- Coordinates: 62°28′24″S 60°11′35″W
- Archipelago: Dunbar Islands; South Shetland Islands
- Area: 0.17 km^{2} (0.066 sq mi)
- Length: 0.6 km (0.37 mi)
- Width: 0.3 km (0.19 mi)

Administration
- Administered under the Antarctic Treaty System

Demographics
- Population: Uninhabited

Balsha Island (Bulgarian: остров Балша, romanized: ostrov Balsha, IPA: [ˈɔstrov ˈbaɫʃɐ]) is an ice-free island in the Dunbar group off the northwest coast of Varna Peninsula, Livingston Island in the South Shetland Islands, Antarctica. It is situated 1.5 km (0.93 mi) northwest of Slab Point and 2.8 km (1.7 mi) north of Kotis Point. Extending 600 by 300 m (660 by 330 yd), surface area 17 hectares (42 acres). The area was visited by early 19th century sealers.

The island is named after the settlement of Balsha in western Bulgaria.

== Location ==
Balsha Island is located at 62°28′24″S 60°11′35″W. Bulgarian topographic survey by Tangra 2004/05 expedition. British mapping in 1968, Chilean in 1971, Argentine in 1980, Bulgarian in 2005 and 2009.

== See also ==
- Composite Gazetteer of Antarctica.
- List of Antarctic islands south of 60° S
- SCAR
- Territorial claims in Antarctica
