= Iglika, Gabrovo Province =

Iglika
- Village
- Location in Bulgaria
- Coordinates: 42.960°N 25.385°E
- Country: Bulgaria
- Province: Gabrovo Province
- Municipality: Gabrovo
- Time zone: UTC+2 (EET)
  - Summer (DST): UTC+3 (EEST)

Iglika is a village in Gabrovo Municipality, in Gabrovo Province, in northern central Bulgaria.

Iglika Passage in the South Shetland Islands, Antarctica, is named after Iglika.
