= Zed Islands =

Group of islands in Antarctica

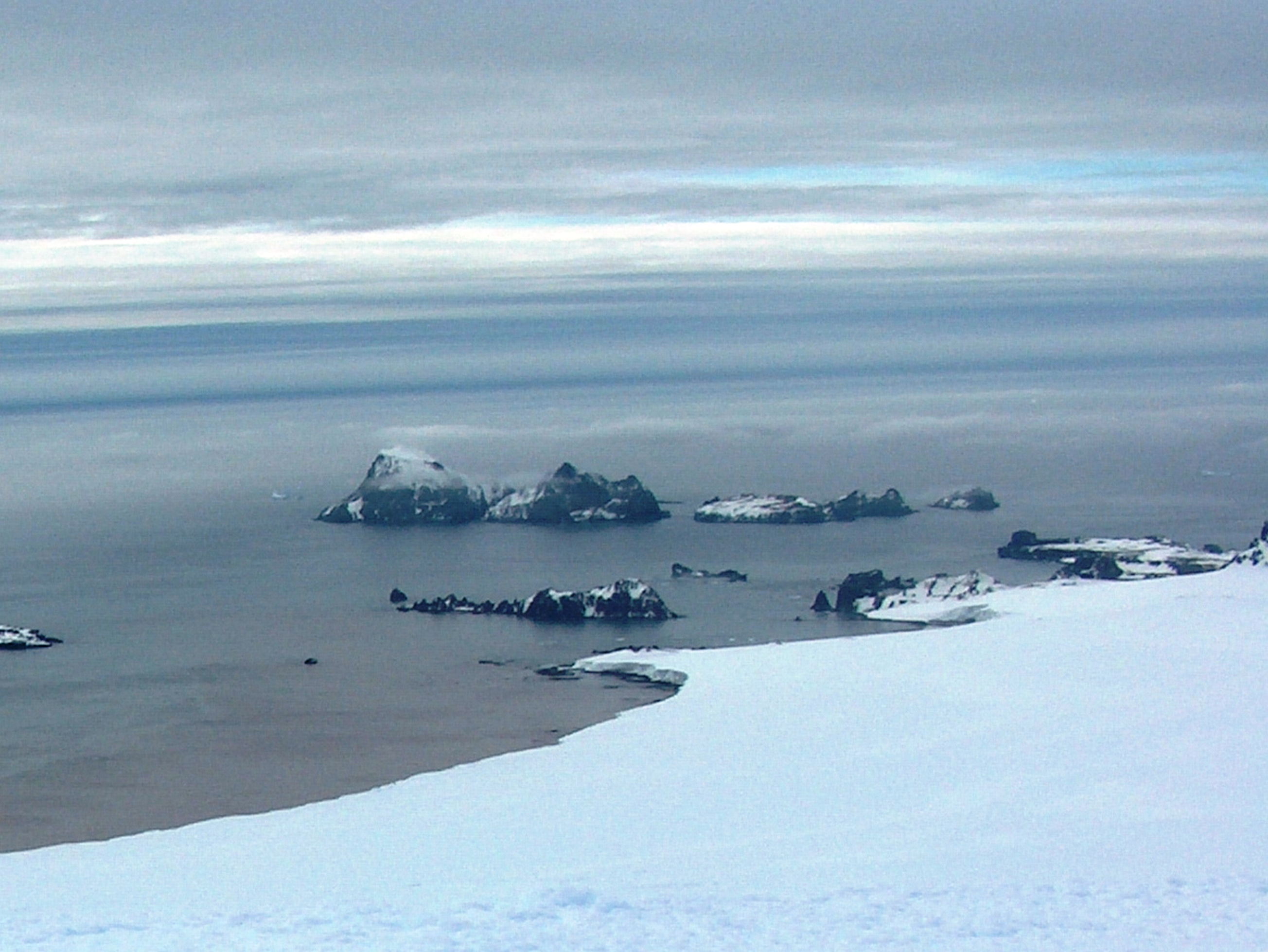
- Zed Islands (in the background) from Miziya Peak, Livingston Island

- Location of Varna Peninsula on Livingston Island in the South Shetland Islands

- Location within Antarctica

Geography
- Location: Antarctica
- Coordinates: 62°26′00″S 60°09′15″W
- Archipelago: South Shetland Islands
- Highest elevation: 290 m (950 ft)

Administration
- Administered under the Antarctic Treaty System

Demographics
- Population: Uninhabited

The Zed Islands are a small group of islands, the westernmost rising to 290 m (951 ft), lying off the northeast extremity of Livingston Island in the South Shetland Islands, Antarctica comprising four islands: Esperanto Island, Phanagoria Island, Lesidren Island and Koshava Island, and the adjacent Dlagnya and Goritsa Rocks. The group is separated from Williams Point on Varna Peninsula, Livingston Island to the south by the 1.50 km (0.93 mi) wide Iglika Passage.

The name appears to have been applied by Discovery Investigations personnel on the Discovery II who charted the islands in 1935.

== Location ==
The midpoint of the group is located at 62°26′00″S 60°09′15″W (British mapping in 1935 and 1968, Chilean in 1971, Argentine in 1980, Spanish in 1991, and Bulgarian in 2005 and 2009).

Topographic map of Livingston Island, Greenwich, Robert, Snow and Smith Islands

== Map ==
- L.L. Ivanov. Antarctica: Livingston Island and Greenwich, Robert, Snow and Smith Islands. Scale 1:120000 topographic map. Troyan: Manfred Wörner Foundation, 2009. ISBN 978-954-92032-6-4

== See also ==
- Composite Antarctic Gazetteer
- List of Antarctic and sub-Antarctic islands
- List of Antarctic islands south of 60° S
- SCAR
- Territorial claims in Antarctica
