= Williams Point =

Point in the South Shetland Islands, Antarctica

Location of Varna Peninsula, Livingston Island in the South Shetland Islands.

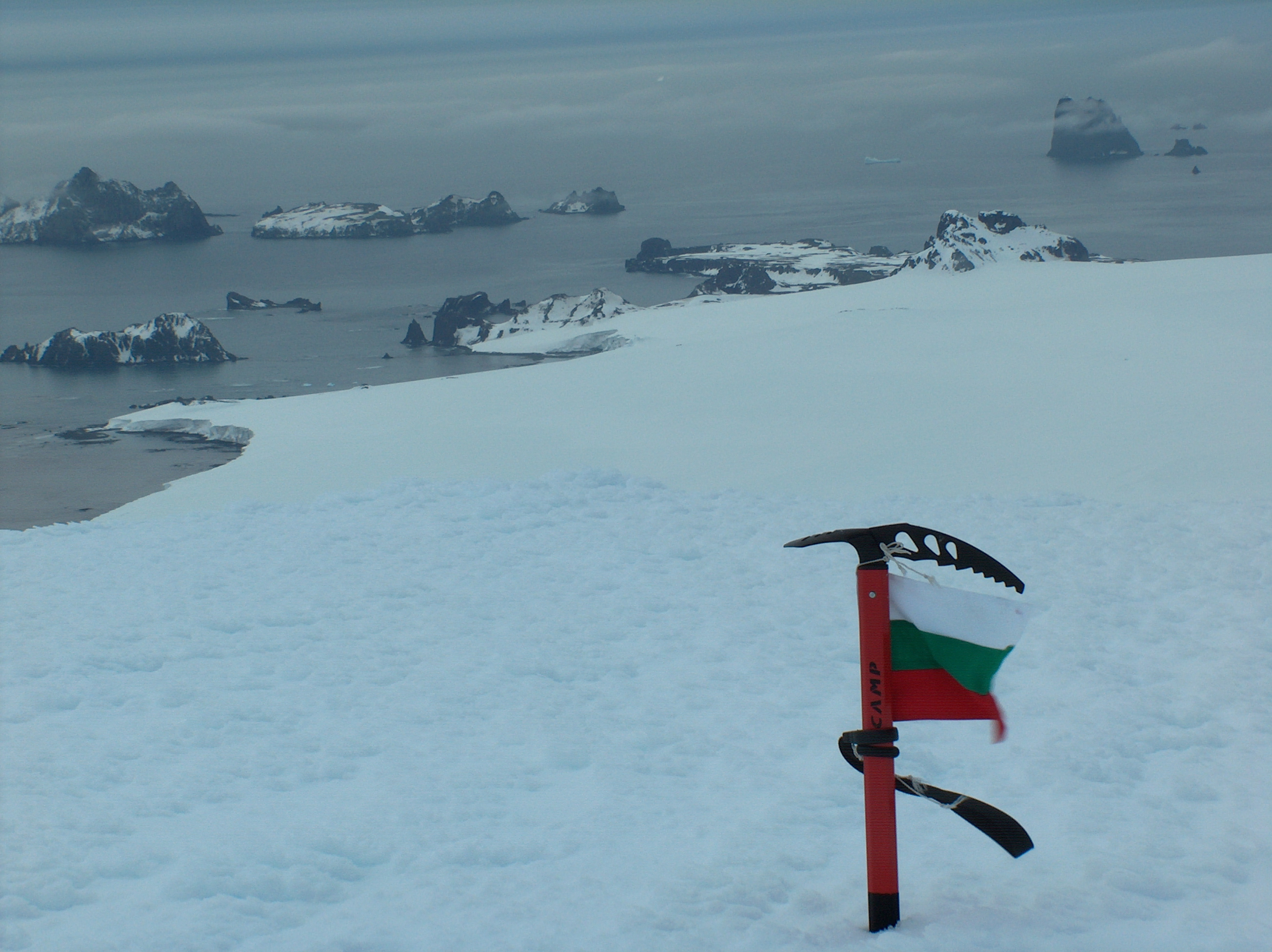
Williams Point from Miziya Peak, with Zed Islands in the background, Pyramid Island on the right and Zavala Island in the foreground.

Topographic map of Livingston Island.

Williams Point is the point forming both the north extremity of Varna Peninsula and the northeast tip of Livingston Island in the South Shetland Islands, Antarctica. Separated from Zed Islands to the north by Iglika Passage.

The discovery of the South Shetland Islands was first reported in 1819 by William Smith, Master of the brig Williams who had sighted the point on 19 February that year. An 1820 publication suggests that Smith gave the name ‘Williams’ to a point of land in this vicinity. In recent years the place name Williams Point has been established in international usage for the point described.

== Location ==
The point is located at 62°27′08″S 60°08′11″W which is 9.47 km north of Miziya Peak in Vidin Heights, 8.8 km east of Desolation Island, 1.5 km south of Zed Islands and 5.5 km west of Duff Point on Greenwich Island. British mapping in 1822, Chilean in 1971, Argentine in 1980, Spanish in 1991, and Bulgarian in 2005 and 2009.

== Maps ==
- Chart of South Shetland including Coronation Island, &c. from the exploration of the sloop Dove in the years 1821 and 1822 by George Powell Commander of the same. Scale ca. 1:200000. London: Laurie, 1822.
- South Shetland Islands. Scale 1:200000 topographic map. DOS 610 Sheet W 62 60. Tolworth, UK, 1968.
- Isla Elefante an Isla Trinidad. Mapa hidrográfico a escala 1:500000 - 1:350000. Valparaíso: Instituto Hidrográfico de la Armada de Chile, 1971.
- Islas Shetland del Sur de Isla 25 de Mayo an Isla Livingston. Mapa hidrográfico a escala 1:200000. Buenos Aires: Servicio de Hidrografía Naval de la Armada, 1980.
- Islas Livingston y Decepción. Mapa topográfico a escala 1:100000. Madrid: Servicio Geográfico del Ejército, 1991.
- S. Soccol, D. Gildea and J. Bath. Livingston Island, Antarctica. Scale 1:100000 satellite map. The Omega Foundation, USA, 2004.
- L.L. Ivanov et al., Antarctica: Livingston Island and Greenwich Island, South Shetland Islands (from English Strait to Morton Strait, with illustrations and ice-cover distribution), 1:100000 scale topographic map, Antarctic Place-names Commission of Bulgaria, Sofia, 2005
- L.L. Ivanov. Antarctica: Livingston Island and Greenwich, Robert, Snow and Smith Islands. Scale 1:120000 topographic map. Troyan: Manfred Wörner Foundation, 2010. ISBN 978-954-92032-9-5 (First edition 2009. ISBN 978-954-92032-6-4)
- Antarctic Digital Database (ADD). Scale 1:250000 topographic map of Antarctica. Scientific Committee on Antarctic Research (SCAR). Since 1993, regularly upgraded and updated.
- L.L. Ivanov. Antarctica: Livingston Island and Smith Island. Scale 1:100000 topographic map. Manfred Wörner Foundation, 2017. ISBN 978-619-90008-3-0
