= Varna Peninsula =

Peninsula in Antarctica

Location of Varna Peninsula on Livingston Island in the South Shetland Islands.

Topographic map of Livingston Island.

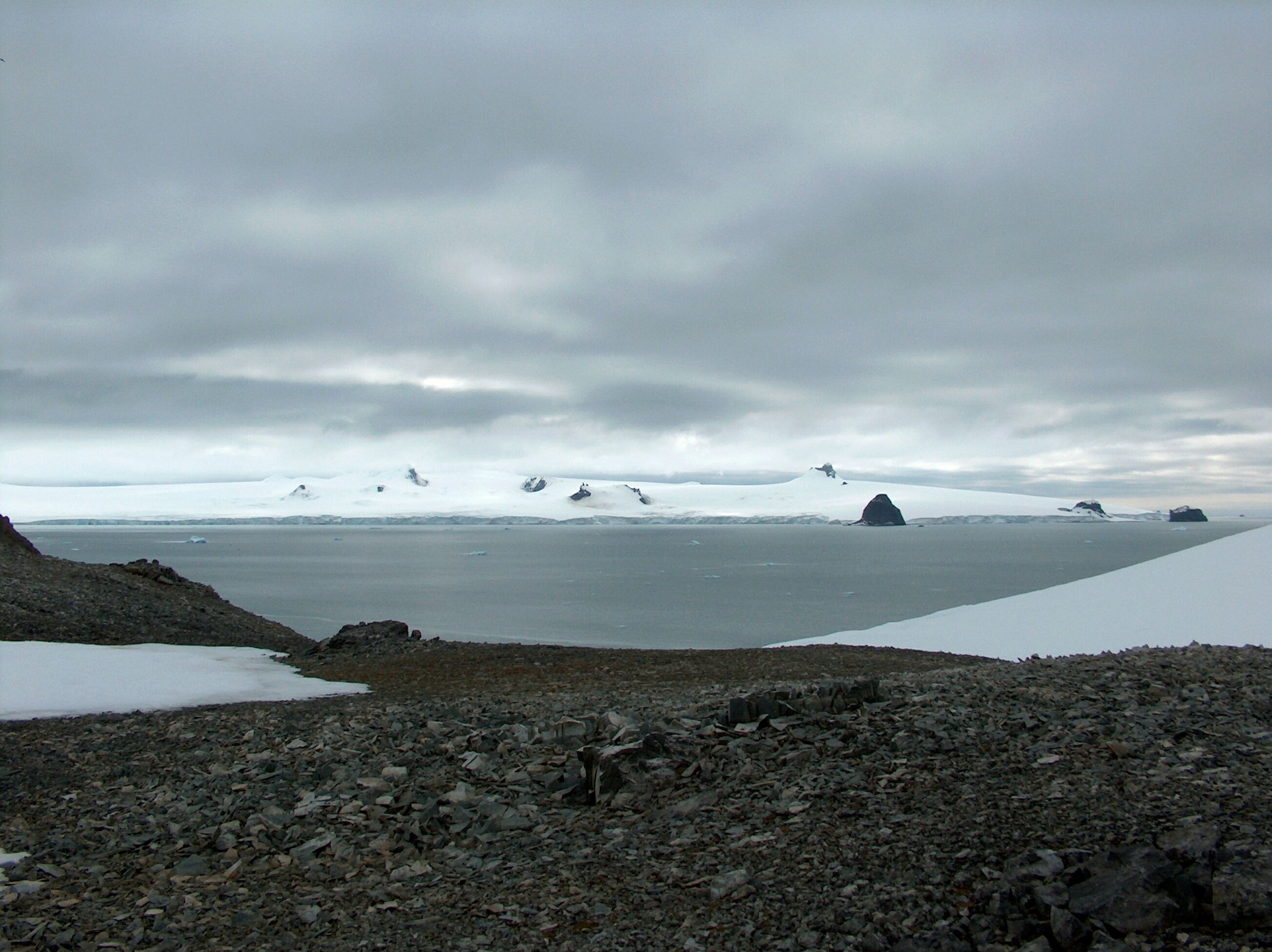
Varna Peninsula from Half Moon Island.

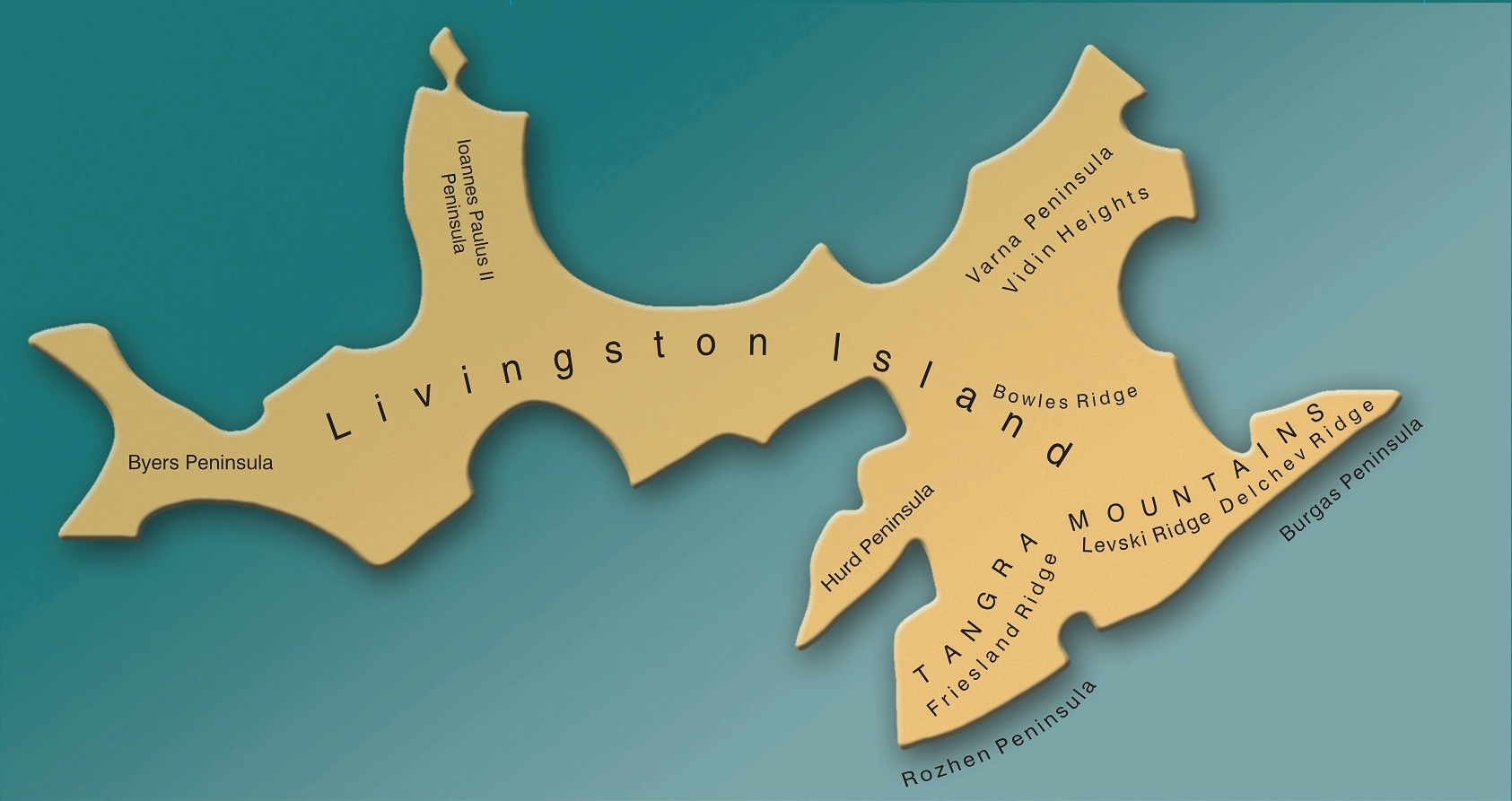
Livingston Island peninsulas.

Varna Peninsula (Bulgarian: полуостров Варна, romanized: poluostrov Varna, IPA: [poɫuˈɔstrov ˈvarnɐ]) is a roughly rectangular predominantly ice-covered peninsula forming the northeast extremity of Livingston Island in the South Shetland Islands, Antarctica. It is bounded by Hero Bay to the northwest, by Moon Bay to the southeast, and by McFarlane Strait to the northeast.

The peninsula is approximately 14 km long in the southwest–northeast direction and 10 km wide, with a central area occupied by Vidin Heights. The north and east extremities of Varna Peninsula are formed by Phelps Promontory and Williams Point, and by Inott Point respectively. The coast is indented by Lister Cove and Dragon Cove to the northeast, and by Griffin Cove, Charybdis Cove and Eliseyna Cove to the northwest. Bezmer Point is also on the northwest coast of the peninsula.

The area was visited by early 19th century sealers. Williams Point was the first land discovered in the Antarctic Treaty area, by the British navigator William Smith on 19 February 1819.

Varna is the name of a major city on the Bulgarian Black Sea Coast. This is one of the Bulgarian names bestowed on previously nameless geographical features by the Tangra 2004/05 Expedition.

== Location ==
The midpoint is located at 62°30′55″S 60°09′45″W (British mapping in 1822 and 1968, Chilean in 1971, Argentine in 1980, Spanish mapping in 1991, and Bulgarian topographic survey Tangra 2004/05 and mapping in 2005 and 2009).

== See also ==
- Vidin Heights
- Livingston Island

== Maps ==
- South Shetland Islands. Scale 1:200000 topographic map. DOS 610 Sheet W 62 60. Tolworth, UK, 1968.
- Islas Livingston y Decepción. Mapa topográfico a escala 1:100000. Madrid: Servicio Geográfico del Ejército, 1991.
- L.L. Ivanov. Livingston Island: Central-Eastern Region. Scale 1:25000 topographic map. Sofia: Antarctic Place-names Commission of Bulgaria, 1996.
- S. Soccol, D. Gildea and J. Bath. Livingston Island, Antarctica. Scale 1:100000 satellite map. The Omega Foundation, USA, 2004.
- L.L. Ivanov et al., Antarctica: Livingston Island and Greenwich Island, South Shetland Islands (from English Strait to Morton Strait, with illustrations and ice-cover distribution), 1:100000 scale topographic map, Antarctic Place-names Commission of Bulgaria, Sofia, 2005
- L.L. Ivanov. Antarctica: Livingston Island and Greenwich, Robert, Snow and Smith Islands. Scale 1:120000 topographic map. Troyan: Manfred Wörner Foundation, 2010. ISBN 978-954-92032-9-5 (First edition 2009. ISBN 978-954-92032-6-4)
- Antarctic Digital Database (ADD). Scale 1:250000 topographic map of Antarctica. Scientific Committee on Antarctic Research (SCAR). Since 1993, regularly upgraded and updated.
- L.L. Ivanov. Antarctica: Livingston Island and Smith Island. Scale 1:100000 topographic map. Manfred Wörner Foundation, 2017. ISBN 978-619-90008-3-0
