= II-44 road (Bulgaria) =

Road in Bulgaria

Republic Road I-44
- Републикански път I-44

Route information
- Length: 38 km (24 mi)

Major junctions
- From: Km 80.0 of I-4
- To: Km 146.5 of I-5, Gabrovo

Location
- Country: Bulgaria
- Towns: Veliki Preslav, Targovishte

Highway system
- Highways in Bulgaria

Republican Road II-44 (Bulgarian: Републикански път II-44) is a second-class road in northern Bulgaria, running entirely through Gabrovo Province. Its length is 38 km.

== Route description ==
The road starts at Km 80 of the first class I-4 road northeast of the town of Sevlievo and heads in southeast though the Sevlievo Field. It runs through the town center and turns south along the left bank of the river Rositsa. After the confluence between the Rositsa and its tributary the Vidima, the road crosses the former and continues along its right bank and then southeast along the wide valley of the Lopushnitsa. The II-44 runs through the villages of Draganovtsi, Novakovtsi, Vranilovtsi, Yankovtsi and Popovtsi, and enters the city of Gabrovo, where it reaches its terminus at Km 147.5 of the second class I-5 road.
