= Rachevtsi =

Rachevtsi Рачевци
- Village
- Location within Bulgaria
- Coordinates: 42°53′N 25°17′E
- Country: Bulgaria
- Province: Gabrovo Province
- Municipality: Gabrovo
- Elevation: 387 m (1,270 ft)

Population (2022)
  - Total: 24
- Time zone: UTC+2 (EET)
  - Summer (DST): UTC+3 (EEST)

Rachevtsi (Bulgarian: Рачевци [ˈrachevtsi]) is a village in Gabrovo Municipality, in Gabrovo Province, in central northern Bulgaria.

== Geography ==
Rachevtsi is located about 4 km west-northwest from Gabrovo's town center. It is located on a northern slope in the northeastern foothills of the Chernovrashki hill. The altitude in the northern part of the village is about 375 m, and in the southern part it rises to about 420-430 m.

The way to the village of Rachevtsi is through a left turn from the municipal road, which starts from the intersection in the village of Popovtsi with the second-class republican road II-44 (Sevlievo - Gabrovo) to the south of the villages of Gergini, Garvan, Peiovtsi and Nikolchovtsi.

The population of the village of Rachevtsi, which numbered 134 people in the 1934 census, decreased to 16 in 1985 and by 2019 had (according to the current demographic statistics for the population) 26 people.

== History ==
In 1995, the former settlement Rachevtsi huts acquired the status of a village.
