= Genchovtsi =

Genchovtsi may refer to the following places in Bulgaria:

- Genchovtsi, Gabrovo, village in Gabrovo municipality, Gabrovo Province
- Genchovtsi, Tryavna, village in Tryavna municipality, Gabrovo Province
