= Kmetovtsi =

- Village
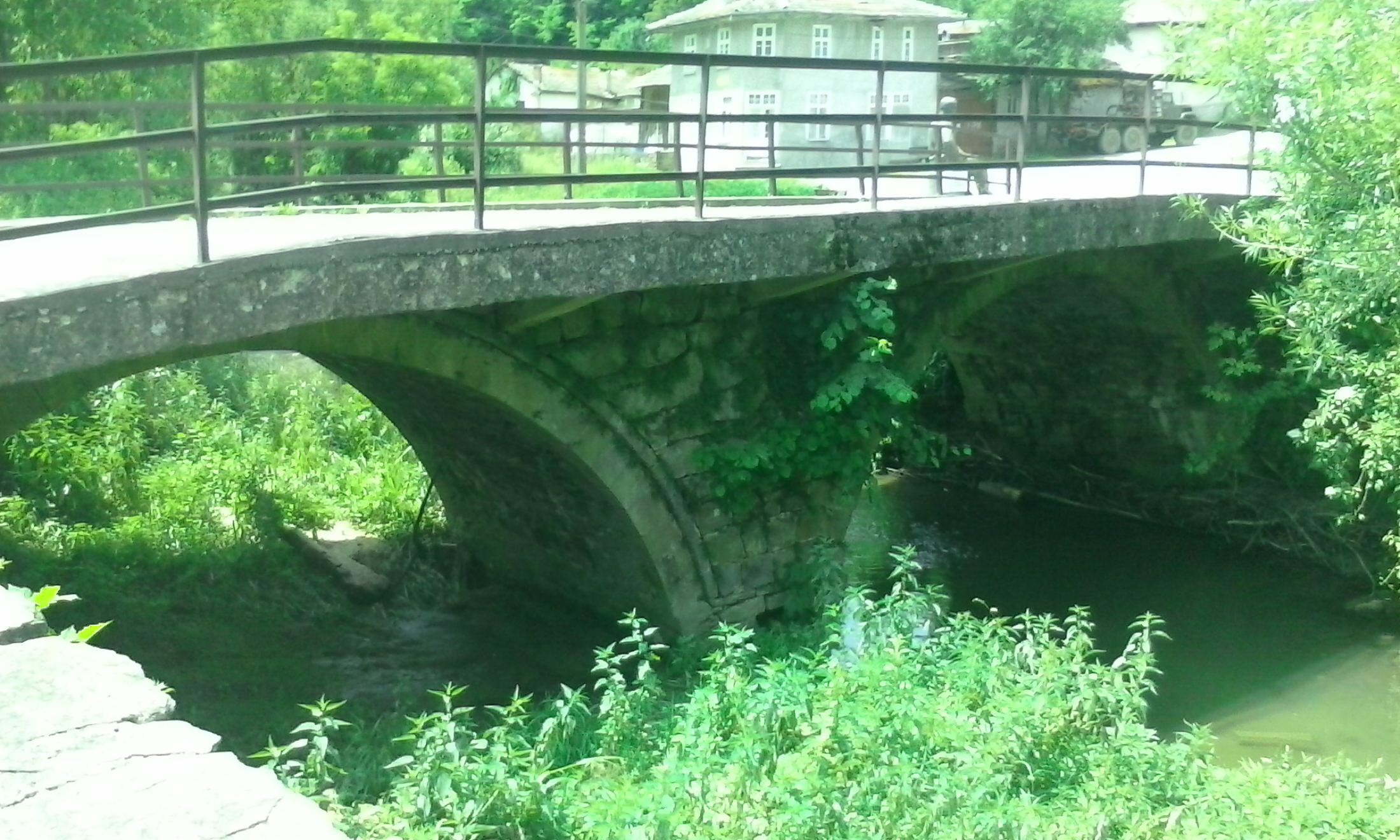

- Location within Bulgaria
- Coordinates: 42°54′N 25°23′E
- Country: Bulgaria
- Province: Gabrovo Province
- Municipality: Gabrovo

Population (2015)
  - Total: 65
- Time zone: UTC+2 (EET)
  - Summer (DST): UTC+3 (EEST)

Kmetovtsi is a village in Gabrovo Municipality, in Gabrovo Province, in northern central Bulgaria. It is located 7 km east of Gabrovo in the middle of the road between Gabrovo and Bozhentsi. The river Bozhana separates it from the neighboring Boltata. Preserved since the time of the Bulgarian National Revival and used to this day is the old stone bridge over the river Bozhana on the road to Bozhentsi and Tryavna built in 1872.
