= Novak (disambiguation) =

Novak may refer to:

- Novak, surname and given name
- Novak, Centar Župa, village in Republic of Macedonia
- Novak Electronics, manufacturer of radio control electronic equipment
- Novak v. City of Parma, case regarding retaliatory prosecution

== See also ==
- Novac (disambiguation)
- Novaković, a surname
- Novakovići, a village in Republika Srpska, Bosnia and Herzegovina
- Novakovtsi, a village in Bulgaria
- Novakovo, Varna Province, a village in Bulgaria
