= Stefanovo =

Stefanovo refers to the following places in Bulgaria:

- Stefanovo, Dobrich Province
- Stefanovo, Gabrovo Province
- Stefanovo, Lovech Province
- Stefanovo, Pernik Province
