= Petrovci =

Petrovci may refer to:

== Places ==
- Petrovci, Croatia, a place in Croatia
- Donji Petrovci, a village in Serbia
- Gornji Petrovci, a town and a municipality in Slovenia
- Murski Petrovci, a place in Slovenia

== People ==
- Enver Petrovci (1954–2025), Albanian actor, writer and director

== See also ==
- Petrovtsi
