= Divett =

Divett is a surname. Notable people with the surname include

- Arthur Divett Hayter, 1st Baron Haversham (1835–1917), British politician
- Edward Divett (1797–1864), British politician
- Neil Graham Divett, Surveyor General of Queensland
- Thomas Divett (1769–1828), English politician

== See also ==
- Divetsi
