= Sharani =

Sharani may refer to:

- Sharani, Bulgaria
- Sharani, Iran
- Shaʿrānī, a 16th-century scholar and mystic
