= Popovtsi =

Popovtsi may refer to one of the following villages in Bulgaria:

- Popovtsi, Gabrovo Province
- Popovtsi, Sofia Province
- Popovtsi in Veliko Turnovo Province, more commonly known as Voinezha, Veliko Turnovo Province
