= Calinic Miclescu =

Romanian Eastern Orthodox bishop (1822–1886)

His Eminence Calinic
- Metropolitan of All Romania
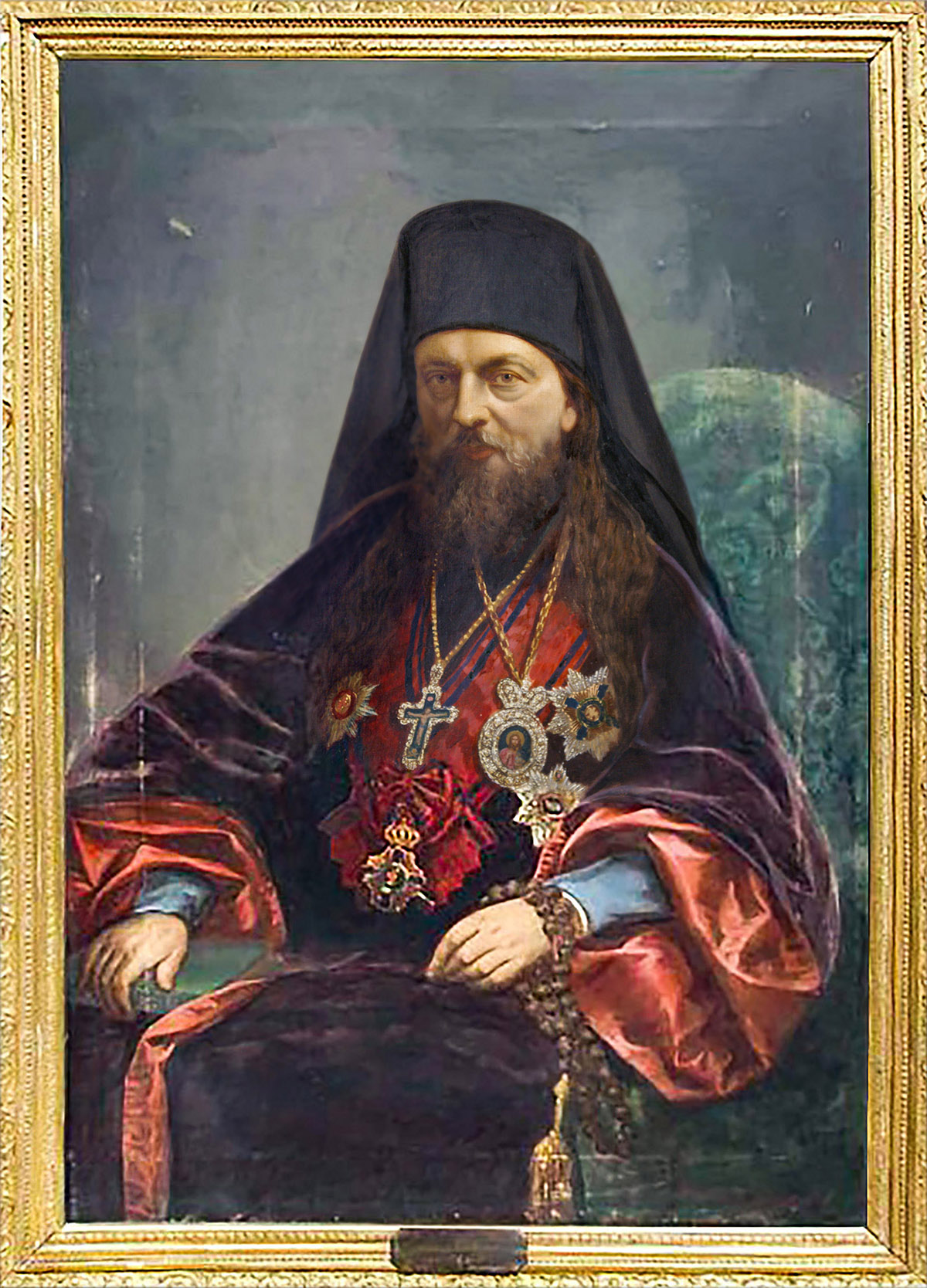
- Oil painting by Carol Szathmari, 1878
- Church: Romanian Orthodox Church
- See: Bucharest
- Installed: 31 May 1875
- Term ended: 14 August 1886
- Predecessor: Nifon Rusailă
- Successor: Iosif Gheorghian
- Other post: Metropolitan of Moldavia (1865–1875)
- Previous posts: Bishop of Hierapolis (1855–1865)

Orders
- Consecration: 2 February 1855 by Sophronius Miclescu

Personal details
- Born: Constantin Miclescu; 16 April 1822 Suceava, Moldavia
- Died: 14 August 1886 (aged 64) Bucharest, Kingdom of Romania
- Denomination: Eastern Orthodox Church

Calinic Miclescu (monastic name of Constantin Miclescu; 16 April 1822 – 14 August 1886) was a Romanian Orthodox bishop, who served as the head of the Romanian Orthodox Church from 1875 to 1886.

== Biography ==
He came from a boyar family. He began his monastic life at the age of twenty at the Huși Monastery, professing his perpetual vows before Bishop Sophronius of Huși (his uncle) and taking the monastic name of Calinic. On 23 April 1843, he was ordained a hierodeacon, and on 30 November 1848, a hieromonk. Before 1855, he received the rank of archimandrite. In 1851, he became superior of the Slatina Monastery.

On 2 February 1855, he was ordained bishop of Hierapolis, vicar of the Metropolitanate of Moldavia. He continued as superior of Slatina Monastery until 1858. In Malini, he opened a school for children from peasant families. In 1857, he served on the Moldavian ad hoc divan, which officially initiated the unification of Moldavia and Wallachia. He again headed the monastery from 1861 to 1863. Calinic gained the trust of Domnitor Alexandru Ioan Cuza, the ruler of the United Principalities, when he supported the secularization of the monastic estates, which Cuza initiated, with the understanding that the lands and funds thus obtained should serve the development of local communities, including education.

In 1865, by decree of Cuza, he became the metropolitan of Moldavia. He was one of the first hierarchs appointed to office in this way; the interference of the ruler of the United Principalities sparked protests from some of the clergy (the so-called "canonicity struggle").

After the forced abdication of Cuza in February 1866, Calinic was skeptical of the idea of entrusting the throne of the United Principalities to a foreign ruler. This is likely why, in April of that year, he joined a conspiracy aimed at the secession of Moldavia. He participated in a separatist demonstration in Iași, which was dispersed by the Romanian Army on the orders of one of the regents, Lascăr Catargiu. He was wounded; his life was saved by deacon Ion Creangă.

In 1875, Metropolitan Calinic assumed the office of Metropolitan of All Romania, the head of the Romanian Orthodox Church. During his tenure, the Faculty of Theology was established at the University of Bucharest, and in 1882, an Orthodox printing house was established. It was also during his tenure that the Ecumenical Patriarchate of Constantinople agreed to allow the autocephalous Romanian Orthodox Church to function as a metropolitan see.
