= Raynovtsi =

- Village
- Location in Bulgaria
- Coordinates: 42.901°N 25.198°E
- Country: Bulgaria
- Province: Gabrovo Province
- Municipality: Gabrovo
- Time zone: UTC+2 (EET)
  - Summer (DST): UTC+3 (EEST)

Raynovtsi is a village in Gabrovo Municipality, in Gabrovo Province, in northern central Bulgaria.

In Bulgarian (Native transliteration): Село Райновци Other transliteration(s): Rainovci, Raynovtzi Region: North-Central planning region of Bulgaria District: Veliko Turnovo district Municipality: Elena municipality Latitude: 42.8833351 Longitude: 25.8500004 Altitude: from 500 to 699 Distance by air to the capital city Sofia: 207.895km Postal Code: 5094 Phone Code: 06713
