= Milkovtsi =

- Village
- Location in Bulgaria
- Coordinates: 42.917°N 25.248°E
- Country: Bulgaria
- Province: Gabrovo Province
- Municipality: Gabrovo
- Time zone: UTC+2 (EET)
  - Summer (DST): UTC+3 (EEST)

Milkovtsi is a village in Gabrovo Municipality, in Gabrovo Province, in northern central Bulgaria. It is situated at an elevation of 1,669 feet above sea level (508 meters), and the land has several rivers running through it.
