= Chitakovtsi =

- Village
- Location within Bulgaria
- Coordinates: 42°56′N 25°18′E
- Country: Bulgaria
- Province: Gabrovo Province
- Municipality: Gabrovo
- Time zone: UTC+2 (EET)
  - Summer (DST): UTC+3 (EEST)

Chitakovtsi is a village in Gabrovo Municipality, in Gabrovo Province, in northern central Bulgaria. The Inhabitants were once was Çıtak Turks (Čitaci). Evliya Çelebi described the Çıtak Turks (Chitak), in his Seyahatname as "a mixture of various peoples such as Bulgarian, Greek, Tatar, and Moldovan," and even gave examples from their language. Some of them, during the 1877-1878 Ottoman-Russian War, the Balkan wars of 1912-1913, and after World War I (1914-1915), immigrated to Anatolia, settling in Ankara, while others moved to Tekirdağ and Çanakkale provinces.
