= Potok, Bulgaria =

Potok
- Village
- Location within Bulgaria
- Country: Bulgaria
- Province: Gabrovo Province
- Municipality: Gabrovo
- Time zone: UTC+2 (EET)
  - Summer (DST): UTC+3 (EEST)

Potok is a village in Gabrovo Municipality, in Gabrovo Province, in northern central Bulgaria. In 2020 it had a population of 3.
