= Mechkovitsa =

- Village
- Location within Bulgaria
- Coordinates: 42°51′N 25°15′E
- Country: Bulgaria
- Province: Gabrovo Province
- Municipality: Gabrovo
- Time zone: UTC+2 (EET)
  - Summer (DST): UTC+3 (EEST)

Mechkovitsa is a village in Gabrovo Municipality, in Gabrovo Province, in northern central Bulgaria. The population in 2008 was 30 persons.
