= Iztochnik =

- Village
- Location in Bulgaria
- Coordinates: 42°52′37″N 25°23′27″E
- Country: Bulgaria
- Province: Gabrovo Province
- Municipality: Gabrovo
- Time zone: UTC+2 (EET)
  - Summer (DST): UTC+3 (EEST)

Iztochnik is a village in Gabrovo Municipality, in Gabrovo Province, in northern central Bulgaria.
