= Gubene =

- Village
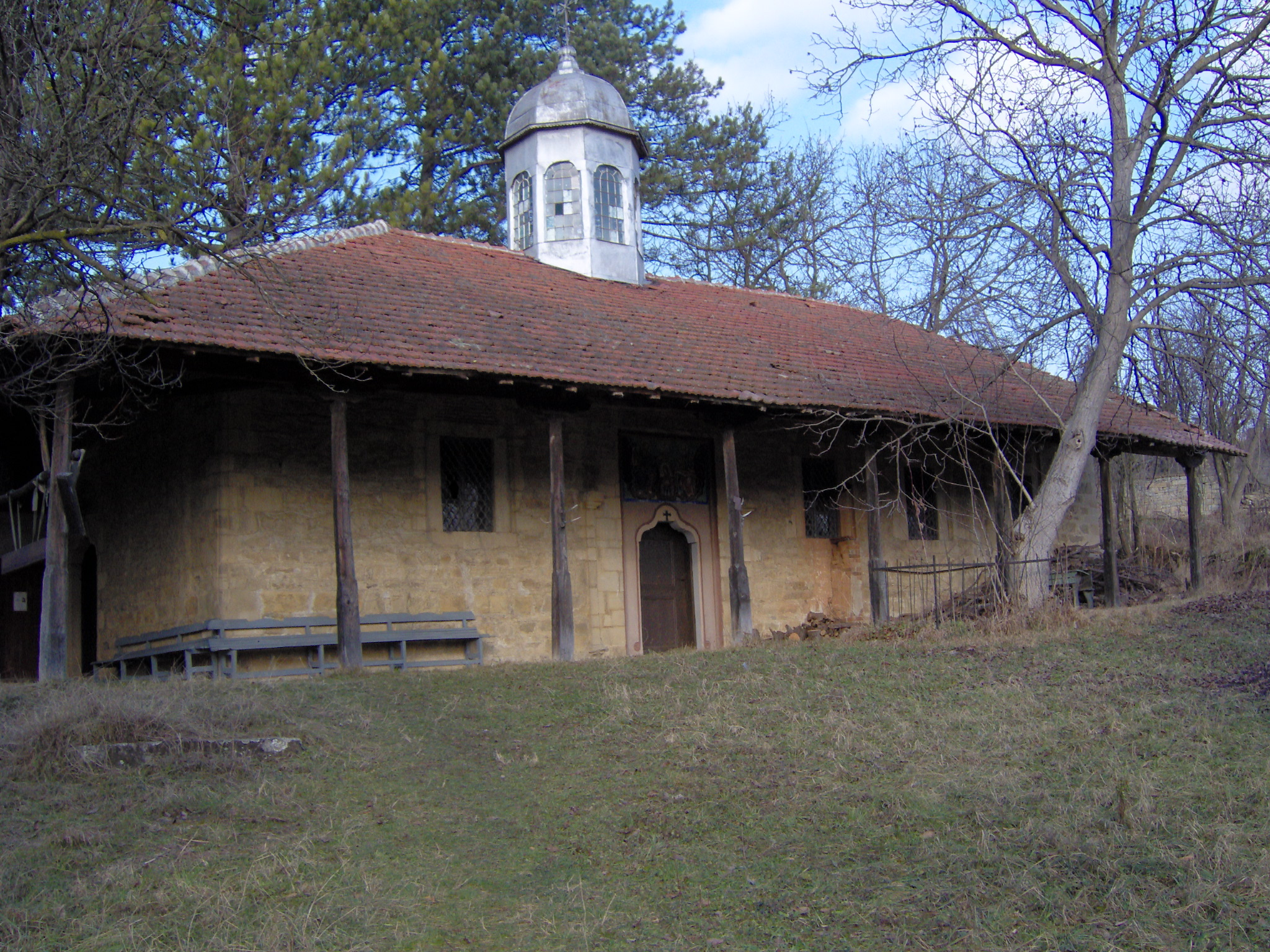
- Church in Gubene

- Location within Bulgaria
- Coordinates: 42°54′N 25°10′E
- Country: Bulgaria
- Province: Gabrovo Province
- Municipality: Gabrovo

Government
  - Mayor of Municipality: Tanya Hristova (GERB)

Area
  - Total: 28,492 km^{2} (11,001 sq mi)

Population (2022)
  - Total: 246
- Time zone: UTC+2 (EET)
  - Summer (DST): UTC+3 (EEST)

Gubene is a village in Gabrovo Municipality, in Gabrovo Province, in northern central Bulgaria.
