= Debel dyal =

- Village
- Location within Bulgaria
- Coordinates: 42°52′N 25°11′E
- Country: Bulgaria
- Province: Gabrovo Province
- Municipality: Gabrovo
- Time zone: UTC+2 (EET)
  - Summer (DST): UTC+3 (EEST)

Debel dyal is a village in Gabrovo Municipality, in Gabrovo Province, in northern central Bulgaria.

Debel dyal is the birthplace of Lazarus Bulgarski (Bulg. Лазар Български), a Christian martyr born 1774, death April 23, 1802.
