= Gledatsi =

- Village
- Location within Bulgaria
- Coordinates: 42°55′N 25°16′E
- Country: Bulgaria
- Province: Gabrovo Province
- Municipality: Gabrovo

Population (2011)
  - Total: 69
- Time zone: UTC+2 (EET)
  - Summer (DST): UTC+3 (EEST)

Gledatsi is a village in Gabrovo Municipality, in Gabrovo Province, in northern central Bulgaria. As of the 2011 Bulgarian Census, 69 people lived in the village, all ethnic Bulgarians.
