= Novak, Centar Župa =

Novak
- Village
- Новак
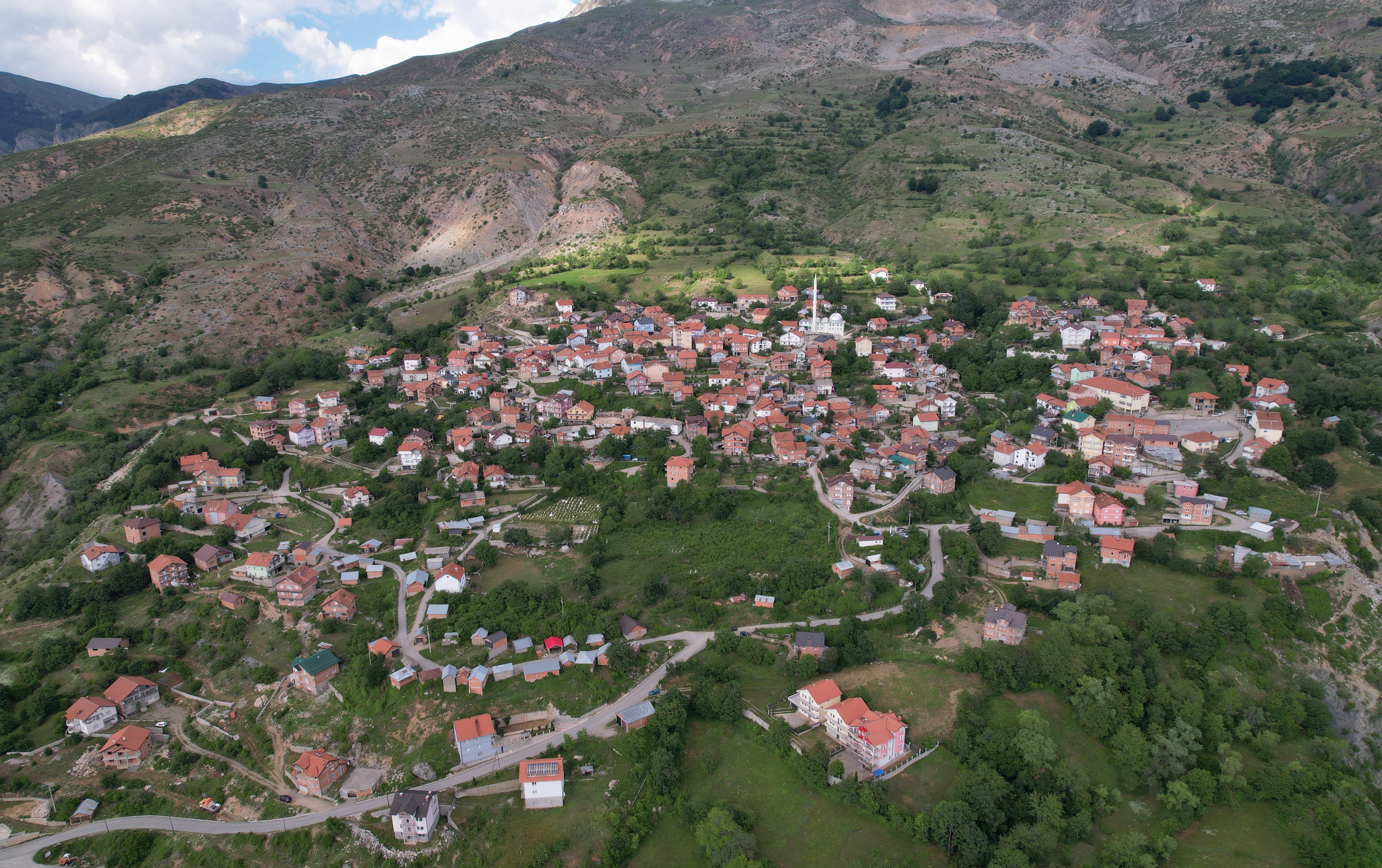
- Airview of the village

- Location within North Macedonia
- Coordinates: 41°26′12″N 20°36′58″E
- Country: North Macedonia
- Region: Southwestern
- Municipality: Centar Župa

Population (2021)
  - Total: 751
- Time zone: UTC+1 (CET)
  - Summer (DST): UTC+2 (CEST)
- Car plates: DB
- Website: .

Novak (Macedonian: Новак, Turkish: Novak) is a village in the municipality of Centar Župa, North Macedonia. The village is inhabited mainly by Turks.

== Demographics ==
Novak is recorded in the Ottoman defter of 1467 as a village in the vilayet of Upper Dibra. The settlement was abandoned.

According to Ottoman tahrir defters from the 1520s, 16 villages (all present-day Centar Župa villages) associated with Kala-i Kodžadžik had no Muslim population. However, the Muslim population increased in subsequent years. This was likely part of the Islamization of Macedonia under Turkish rule.

According to the 1929 ethnographic map by Russian Slavist Afanasy Selishchev, Novak was a mixed Bulgarian-Albanian village.

According to the 1942 Albanian census, Novak was inhabited by 643 Muslim Albanians.

As of the 2021 census, Novak had 751 residents with the following ethnic composition:

- Turks 703
- Persons for whom data are taken from administrative sources 45
- Others 3

According to the 2002 census, the village had a total of 1,006 inhabitants. Ethnic groups in the village include:

- Turks 1,003
- Others 3
