= Draganovtsi =

Draganovtsi Драгановци
- Village
- Location in Bulgaria
- Coordinates: 42.932°N 25.188°E
- Country: Bulgaria
- Province: Gabrovo Province
- Municipality: Gabrovo

Government
  - Mayor: Tzvetomir Tzvyatkov (GERB)

Population (15.03.2022)
  - Total: 391
- Time zone: UTC+2 (EET)
  - Summer (DST): UTC+3 (EEST)

Draganovtsi is a village in Gabrovo Municipality, in Gabrovo Province, in northern central Bulgaria with around 400 inhabitants.
