= Genchovtsi, Gabrovo =

Genchovtsi
- Village
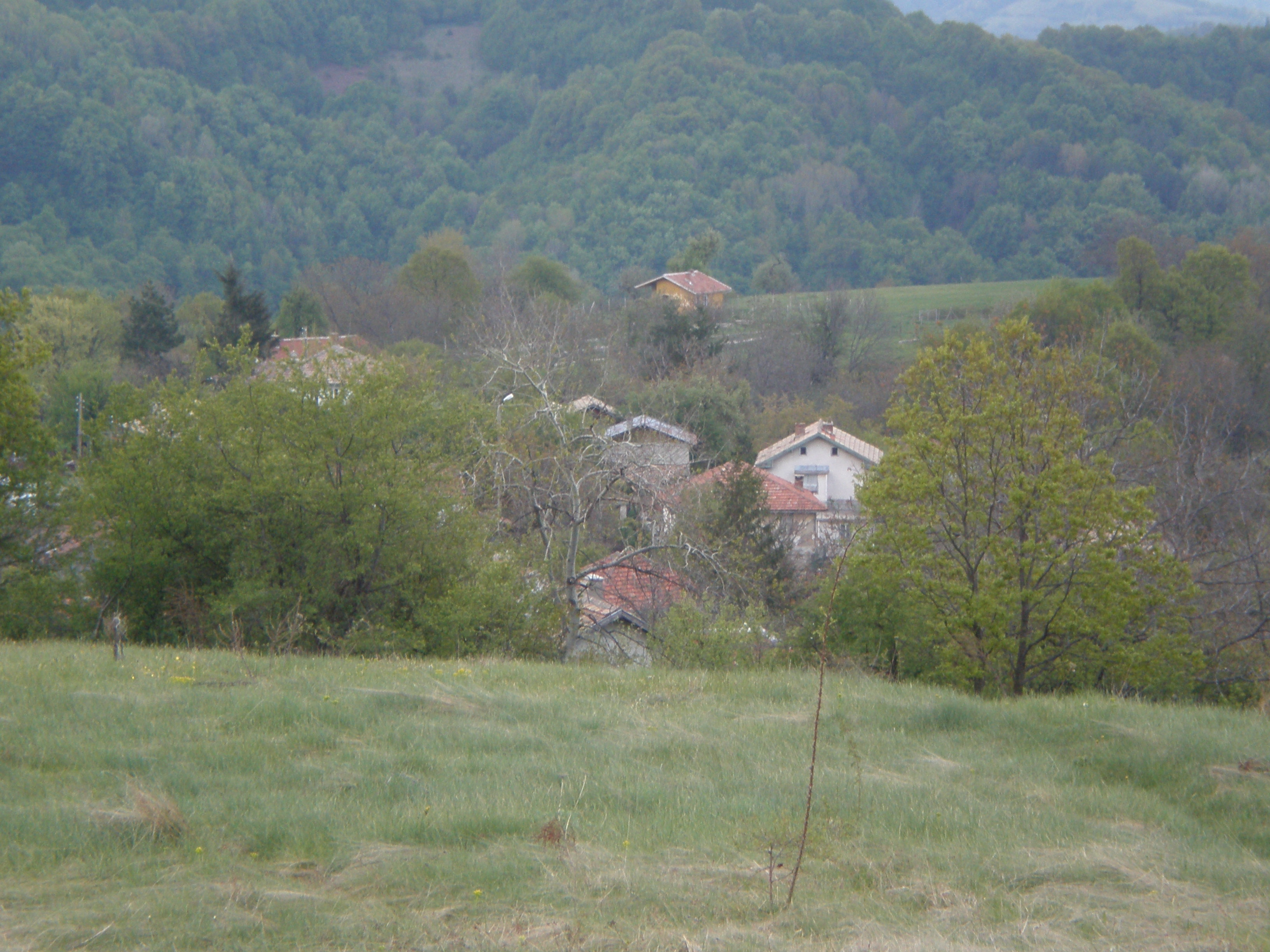
- View from a hill above village of Genchovtzi

- Location in Bulgaria
- Coordinates: 42.829°N 25.391°E
- Country: Bulgaria
- Province: Gabrovo Province
- Municipality: Gabrovo
- Time zone: UTC+2 (EET)
  - Summer (DST): UTC+3 (EEST)

Genchovtsi is a village in Gabrovo Municipality, in Gabrovo Province, in northern central Bulgaria.

== Geographical location ==
The location of Genchovtsi is almost in the middle of Bulgaria. Located into a part of Stara planina, this village is 10 kilometers away from the main city of Gabrovo. You can go to Genchovtsi, driving by the fourth class road, which has many sharp turns and beech trees. There is no regular public transport to the village.

== History ==
Nobody knows exactly when the village of Genchovtsi was founded. But by the words said of old people, the village was named after three brothers who originally settled in the region. They were: Gencho (village of Genchovtsi), Bogdan (village of Bogdanchovtsi), and Fargo (village of Fargovtsi). In the past, Genchovtsi was called Genchomaali – meaning something like a neighbourhood or very small village. Another interesting fact is that many years before Genchovtsi was founded, in the middle of the village, there were graveyards.

== Population ==
The population of Genchovtsi is variable depending on the time of year. In the autumn, winter and spring the population of the village is about 10–15 people, principally men and women over 70 years old. In the summer months, many people who have villas come from all Bulgaria's regions. Then the population of the village grows up to over 50 people.
