= Divetsi =

- Village
- Location within Bulgaria
- Coordinates: 42°54′N 25°16′E
- Country: Bulgaria
- Province: Gabrovo Province
- Municipality: Gabrovo
- Time zone: UTC+2 (EET)
  - Summer (DST): UTC+3 (EEST)

Divetsi is a village in Gabrovo Municipality, in Gabrovo Province, in northern central Bulgaria.

== Geography ==
The village of Divetsi is located about 5 km northwest of the centre of Gabrovo. It is situated in the southern foothills of the Watchtower Plateau. The altitude in the centre of the village is about 390 m, the terrain has a small general slope to the southwest. The municipal road to Divetsi is a right turn off the municipal road leading from a junction with the second-class national road II-44 (Sevlievo - Gabrovo) through the village of Popovtsi to the villages of Gledatsi and Prahalli.
