= Novakovtsi =

- Village
- Location within Bulgaria
- Coordinates: 42°55′N 25°12′E
- Country: Bulgaria
- Province: Gabrovo Province
- Municipality: Gabrovo

Government
  - Mayor of Municipality: Tanya Hristova (GERB)
- Elevation: 286 m (938 ft)

Population (2022)
  - Total: 183
- Time zone: UTC+2 (EET)
  - Summer (DST): UTC+3 (EEST)

Novakovtsi is a village in Gabrovo Municipality, in Gabrovo Province, in northern central Bulgaria.
