= Bozhentsi =

Village in Bulgaria

Coordinates: 42°52′N 25°25′E

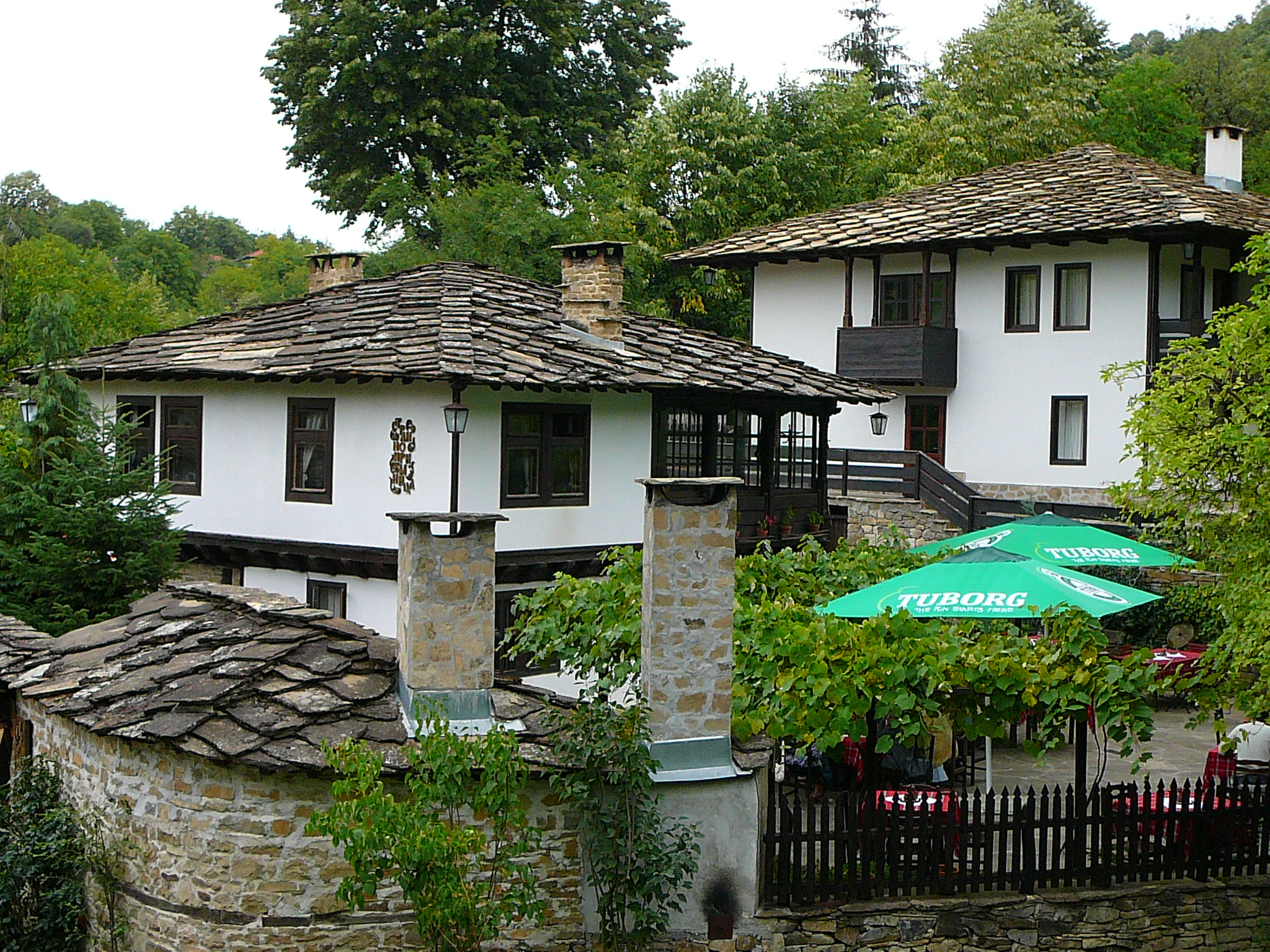
Overview of Bozhentsi

Bozhentsi (Bulgarian: Боженци [boˈʒɛnt͡si]; also variously transliterated as Bozhenci, Bojenci, Bojenzi, Boženci, Bojentsi, Bojentzi, Bozhentzi, etc.), officially but not commonly Bozhentsite (Боженците), is a village and architectural reserve in Gabrovo municipality, Gabrovo Province, in central northern Bulgaria. The village lies in the middle part of the Balkan Mountains, 15 km east of Gabrovo and just north of the Shipka Pass. It is noted for its well-preserved Bulgarian National Revival architecture and history, and is thus a well-known tourist destination in the area.

Bozhentsi was established after the incursion of Ottoman Turks in Veliko Tarnovo, the former capital of the Second Bulgarian Empire, in the 16th century. Many residents of the capital then fled to settle in remote and secure parts of the mountains. According to the legend, among them was the young female noble (bolyarka) Bozhana; she chose to hide in the area where the village is today and became its namesake. The noble's sons engaged in trade and the village gradually grew to become an important trade junction during the National Revival towards the middle of the 18th century. The main production consisted of leather, wool, beeswax and honey.

The village of Bozhentsi was proclaimed an architectural and historical reserve in 1964 and is part of UNESCO's cultural monuments. The National Revival architecture has been preserved in Bozhentsi due to this, and there is a ban on the construction of any buildings that do not fit with the village's style.

As the settlers during the Ottoman rule were mostly wealthy people, many of the houses have two storeys, the first being used as a cattle-shed and the second being inhabited by the owners. Characteristic features of the Bozhentsi architecture are the verandas, the stone-plate roofs, the corner fireplaces and the ceiling woodcarvings. The pavement of the streets in the village is only cobblestone.

The Prophet Elijah basilica, featuring a nave and two aisles, is a remarkable example of the National Revival style. Domes can be seen hidden under the ceiling, as well as massive stone walls and the typical Bozhentsi arches. The church was erected in 1835, and the village's influential residents were allowed to construct a belfry, which was usually strictly forbidden by the Ottoman authorities.

The former class school was constructed in 1872 and was situated in an imposing building near the entrance to the village. It is today a gallery and its first storey would once accommodate a hall and a library, with the classrooms being located on the second storey.

A Roman bridge lies east of the village and a forest path leading to Tryavna begins on the other side.
