= Gabrovo Municipality =

Gabrovo Municipality Община Габрово
- Municipality
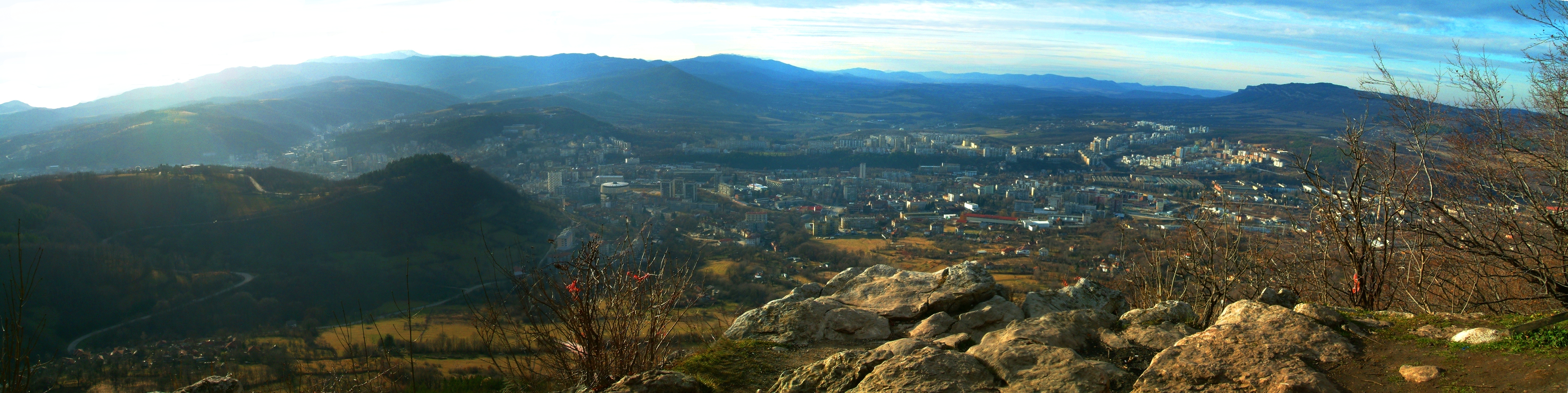

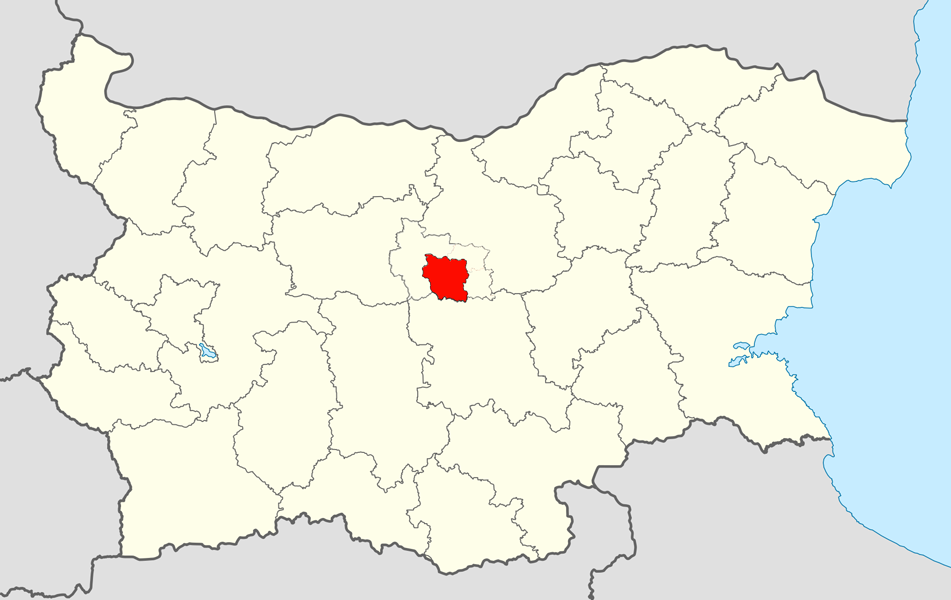
- Gabrovo Municipality within Bulgaria and Gabrovo Province.
- Coordinates: 42°53′N 25°17′E
- Country: Bulgaria
- Province (Oblast): Gabrovo
- Admin. centre (Obshtinski tsentar): Gabrovo

Area
  - Total: 555.57 km^{2} (214.51 sq mi)

Population (December 2018)
  - Total: 57,625
  - Density: 103.72/km^{2} (268.64/sq mi)
- Time zone: UTC+2 (EET)
  - Summer (DST): UTC+3 (EEST)
- Website: www.gabrovo.bg

Gabrovo Municipality (Bulgarian: Община Габрово) is a municipality (obshtina) in Gabrovo Province, North-central Bulgaria, located on the northern slopes of the central Stara planina mountain to the area of the so-called Fore-Balkan. It is named after its administrative centre - the city of Gabrovo which is also the capital of the province.

The municipality embraces a territory of 555.57 square kilometres (214.51 sq mi) with a population of 67,501 inhabitants, as of December 2009.

Aside from the rich cultural landmarks of the main city, the area is known with the preserved architectural reserve of Bozhentsi village and the north approach to Shipka Pass which was a noted place of the Bulgarian history and one of the main transport connections between the north and south parts of Bulgaria and the Balkan Peninsula.

== Settlements ==
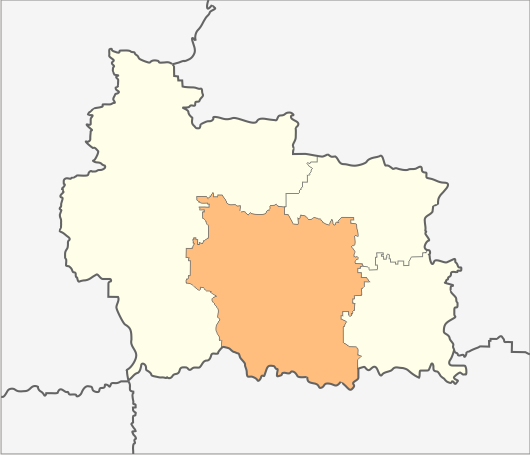
Gabrovo Municipality within Gabrovo Province

(towns are shown in bold): Population (December 2009)

- **Gabrovo** - **Габрово** - 60,281
- Angelov - Ангелов - 46
- Armenite - Армените - 125
- Baevtsi - Баевци - 4
- Balanite - Баланите - 16
- Balinovtsi - Балиновци - 14
- Bankovtsi - Банковци - 30
- Bekriite - Бекриите - 5
- Belomazhite - Беломъжите - 17
- Bobevtsi - Бобевци - 2
- Bogdanchovtsi - Богданчовци - 35
- Bozhentsi - Боженци - 38
- Boynovtsi - Бойновци - 16
- Boycheta - Бойчета - 2
- Boltata - Болтата - 28
- Boriki - Борики - 160
- Borskoto - Борското - 15
- Branetsite - Брънеците - 60
- Byalkovo - Бялково - 11
- Chavei - Чавеи - 27
- Charkovo - Чарково - 171
- Chervena lokva - Червена локва - 6
- Chernevtsi - Черневци - 8
- Chitakovtsi - Читаковци - 15
- Chukilite - Чукилите - 19
- Debel dyal - Дебел дял - 109
- Dzhumriite - Джумриите - 9
- Divetsi - Дивеци - 11
- Donino - Донино - 166
- Draganovtsi - Драгановци - 412
- Draganchetata - Драганчетата - 32
- Dragievtsi - Драгиевци - 47
- Dragomani - Драгомани - 7
- Dumnitsi - Думници - 49
- Ezeroto - Езерото - 22
- Fargovtsi - Фърговци - 25
- Gaykini - Гайкини - 2
- Gaytanite - Гайтаните - 32
- Garvan - Гарван - 53
- Genovtsi - Геновци - 6
- Genchovtsi - Генчовци - 14
- Gergini - Гергини - 138
- Gledatsi - Гледаци - 79
- Gornova mogila - Горнова могила - 4
- Grablevtsi - Гръблевци - 19
- Gabene - Гъбене - 288
- Haracherite - Харачерите - 29
- Ivanili - Иванили - 17
- Ivankovtsi - Иванковци - 29
- Iglikika - Игликика - 10
- Iztochnik - Източник - 21
- Kameshitsa - Камешица - 69
- Karali - Карали - 9
- Kievtsi - Киевци - 118
- Kmetovtsi - Кметовци - 33
- Kmetcheta - Кметчета - 6
- Kozi rog - Кози рог - 71
- Kolishovtsi - Колишовци - 0
- Kopcheliite - Копчелиите - 106
- Kostadinite - Костадините - 7
- Kostenkovtsi - Костенковци - 35
- Lesicharka - Лесичарка - 85
- Loza - Лоза - 65
- Malini - Малини - 30
- Malusha - Малуша - 5
- Mezhdeni - Междени - 45
- Mechkovitsa - Мечковица - 38
- Milkovtsi - Милковци - 48
- Mihaylovtsi - Михайловци - 40
- Michkovtsi - Мичковци - 58
- Mrahori - Мрахори - 33
- Muzga - Музга - 142
- Nikolchovtsi - Николчовци - 39
- Novakovtsi - Новаковци - 128
- Ovoshtartsi - Овощарци - 12
- Orlovtsi - Орловци - 53
- Parchovtsi - Парчовци - 15
- Peyovtsi - Пейовци - 8
- Penkovtsi - Пенковци - 16
- Petrovtsi - Петровци - 8
- Petsovtsi - Пецовци - 34
- Popari - Попари - 2
- Popovtsi - Поповци - 525
- Potok - Поток - 12
- Prahali - Прахали - 51
- Prodanovtsi - Продановци - 0
- Partevtsi - Пъртевци - 7
- Raynovtsi - Райновци - 128
- Rahovtsi - Раховци - 47
- Rachevtsi - Рачевци - 17
- Redeshkovtsi - Редешковци - 0
- Ruychovtsi - Руйчовци - 2
- Ryazkovtsi - Рязковци - 45
- Svinarski dol - Свинарски дол - 13
- Sedyankovtsi - Седянковци - 43
- Seykovtsi - Сейковци - 6
- Semerdzhiite - Семерджиите - 2
- Sharani - Шарани - 15
- Shipchenite - Шипчените - 16
- Smilovtsi - Смиловци - 42
- Solari - Солари - 9
- Spantsi - Спанци - 15
- Spasovtsi - Спасовци - 11
- Starilkovtsi - Старилковци - 7
- Stefanovo - Стефаново - 9
- Stoevtsi - Стоевци - 90
- Stoykovtsi - Стойковци - 19
- Stoychovtsi - Стойчовци - 24
- Stomanetsite - Стоманеците - 28
- Sabotkovtsi - Съботковци - 49
- Todorovtsi - Тодоровци - 8
- Todorcheta - Тодорчета - 17
- Torbalazhite - Торбалъжите - 20
- Trapeskovtsi - Трапесковци - 15
- Tranito - Трънито - 176
- Tsvyatkovtsi - Цвятковци - 17
- Uzunite - Узуните - 18
- Yavorets - Яворец - 631
- Yankovtsi - Янковци - 120
- Yasenite - Ясените - 23

== Demography ==
The following table shows the change of the population during the last four decades.

Gabrovo Municipality
Year	1975	1985	1992	2001	2005	2007	2009	2011
Population	85,932	90,032	84,333	74,949	70,537	69,248	67,501	...
Sources: Census 2001, Census 2011, „pop-stat.mashke.org“,

=== Religion ===
According to the latest Bulgarian census of 2011, the religious composition, among those who answered the optional question on religious identification, was the following:

Religious composition of Gabrovo Municipality
Orthodox Christianity	89.4%
Catholicism	0.5%
Protestantism	0.7%
Islam	0.6%
No religion	3.5%
Prefer not to answer, others and indefinable	5.3%

== See also ==
- Provinces of Bulgaria
- Municipalities of Bulgaria
- List of cities and towns in Bulgaria
