= Gurev Gap =

Location of Livingston Island in the South Shetland Islands.

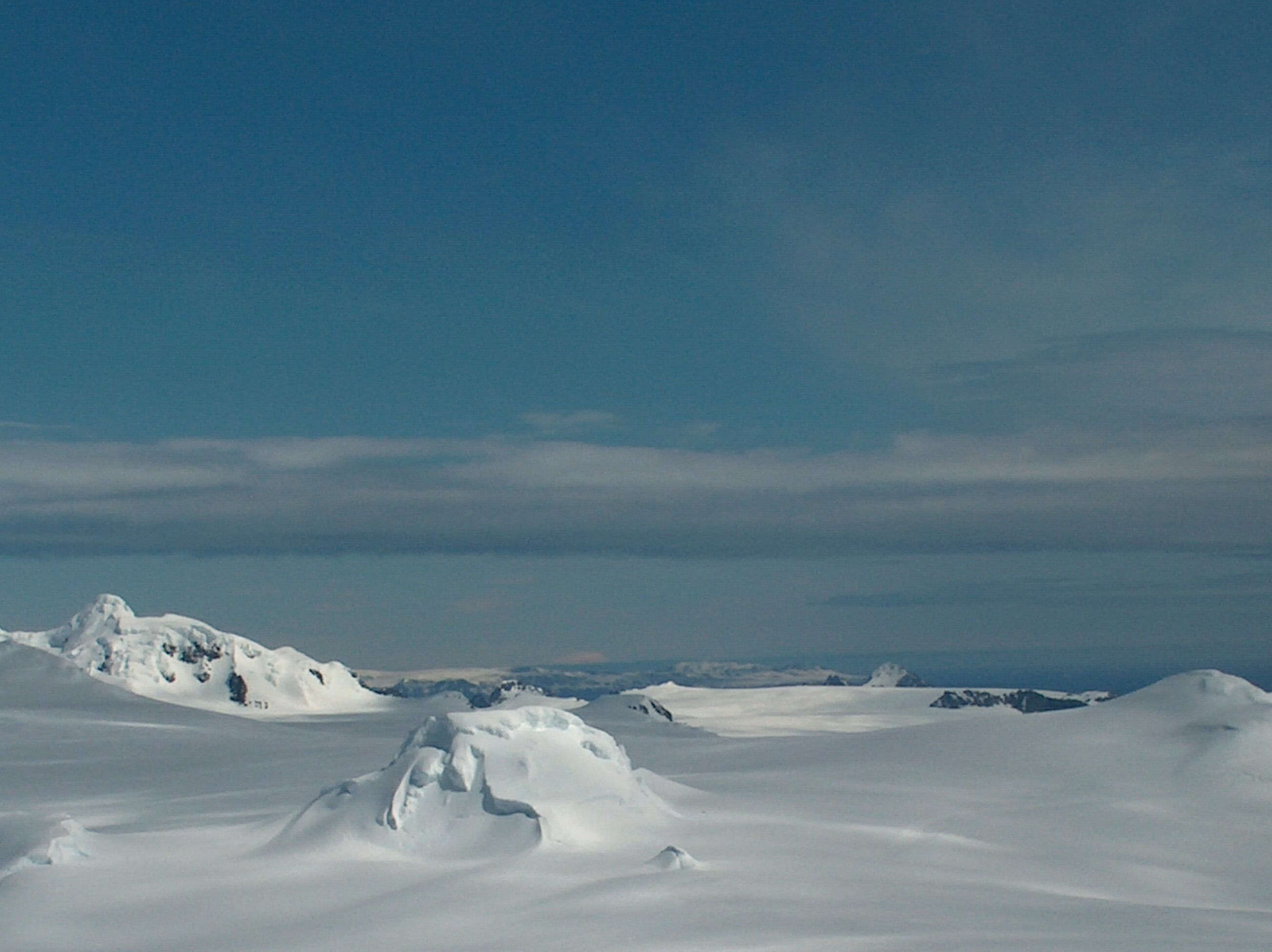
Gurev Gap from Miziya Peak, with Leslie Hill in the foreground, and in the background Burdick Ridge on the left and Hurd Ice Cap on the right.

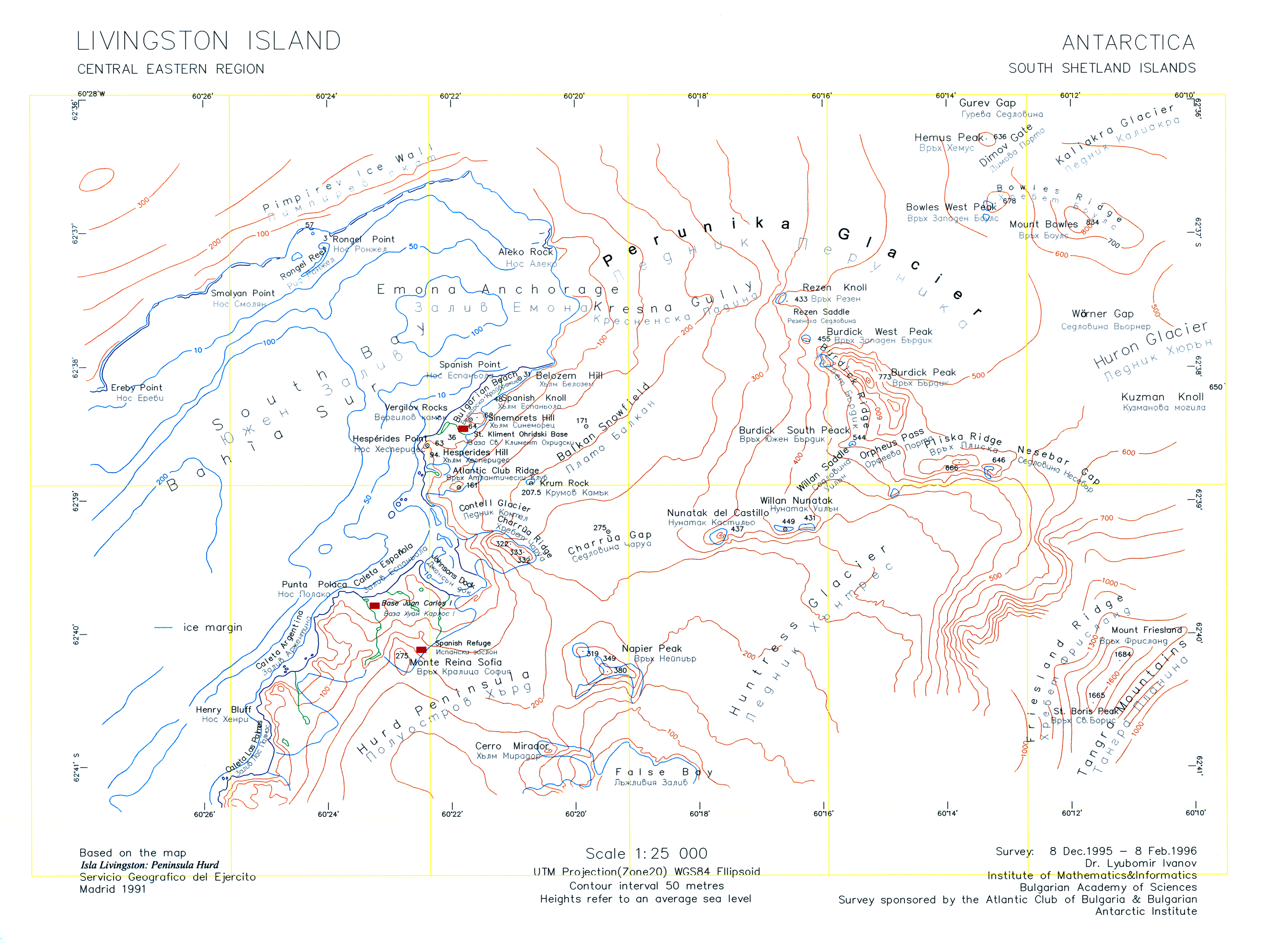
Topographic map of central-eastern Livingston Island featuring Gurev Gap.

Topographic map of Livingston Island, Greenwich, Robert, Snow and Smith Islands.

Gurev Gap (Gureva Sedlovina \'gu-re-va se-dlo-vi-'na\) is a flat ice-covered saddle of elevation 450 m extending 3 km in south-north direction between Hemus Peak and Gleaner Heights in eastern Livingston Island in the South Shetland Islands, Antarctica. The gap separates the glacial catchments of Kaliakra Glacier to the east, and Saedinenie Snowfield and Perunika Glacier to the west. It is part of the overland route from the St. Kliment Ohridski Base via the Balkan Snowfield, Rezen Saddle and Perunika Glacier to Varna Peninsula. The saddle was first trekked on 24 December 2004 by the Tangra 2004/05 Survey team from Camp Academia, and was named for Vasil Gurev, physicist at St. Kliment Ohridski in 1994/95 and subsequent seasons.

== Location ==
The midpoint is centred at 62°35′21.8″S 60°13′01″W, which is 1.85 km south of Elhovo Gap, 3.42 km northwest of Yankov Gap, 3.41 km north-northwest of Omurtag Pass, 2.03 km north of Dimov Gate and 4.83 km northeast by north of Rezen Saddle (Co-ordinates, elevation and distances given according to a 1995/96 Bulgarian topographic survey).

== Maps ==
- L.L. Ivanov. Livingston Island: Central-Eastern Region. Scale 1:25000 topographic map. Sofia: Antarctic Place-names Commission of Bulgaria, 1996.
- S. Soccol, D. Gildea and J. Bath. Livingston Island, Antarctica. Scale 1:100000 satellite map. The Omega Foundation, USA, 2004.
- L.L. Ivanov et al., Antarctica: Livingston Island and Greenwich Island, South Shetland Islands (from English Strait to Morton Strait, with illustrations and ice-cover distribution), 1:100000 scale topographic map, Antarctic Place-names Commission of Bulgaria, Sofia, 2005
- L.L. Ivanov. Antarctica: Livingston Island and Greenwich, Robert, Snow and Smith Islands. Scale 1:120000 topographic map. Troyan: Manfred Wörner Foundation, 2010. ISBN 978-954-92032-9-5 (First edition 2009. ISBN 978-954-92032-6-4)
- Antarctic Digital Database (ADD). Scale 1:250000 topographic map of Antarctica. Scientific Committee on Antarctic Research (SCAR). Since 1993, regularly upgraded and updated.
- A. Kamburov and L. Ivanov. Bowles Ridge and Central Tangra Mountains: Livingston Island, Antarctica. Scale 1:25000 map. Sofia: Manfred Wörner Foundation, 2023. ISBN 978-619-90008-6-1
