= Ahtopol Peak =

Mountain in South Shetland Islands, Antarctica

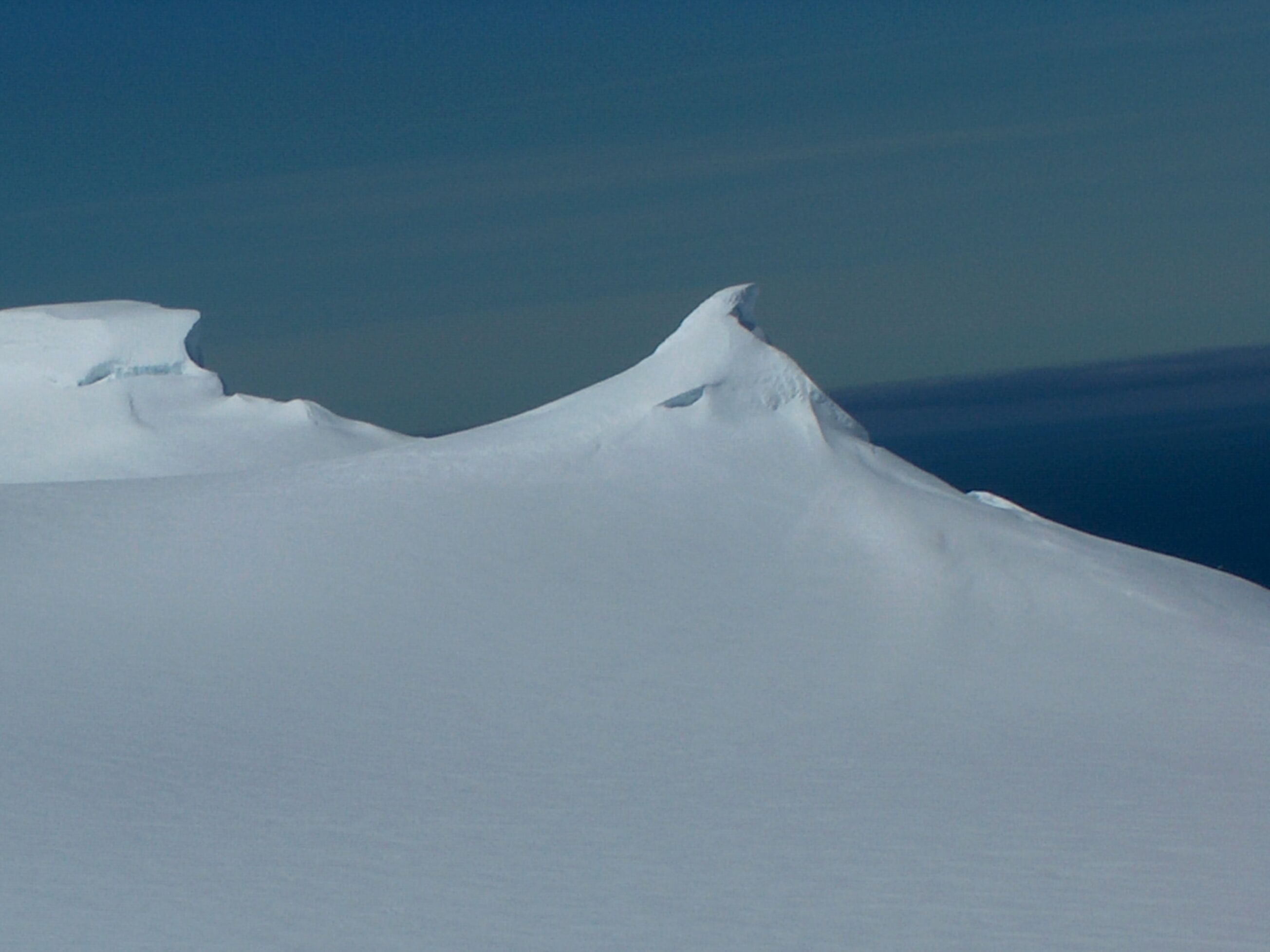
- Ahtopol Peak from Zemen Knoll

Highest point
- Elevation: 510 m (1,670 ft)
- Coordinates: 62°32′34″S 60°08′42″W

Geography
- Location: Livingston Island, Antarctica

Ahtopol Peak (Bulgarian: връх Ахтопол, romanized: vrah Ahtopol, IPA: [ˈvrɤx ɐxˈtɔpoɫ]) is a sharp peak 510m in the Vidin Heights on Varna Peninsula, Livingston Island. The peak is named after the Black Sea town of Ahtopol, Bulgaria.

== Location ==
The peak is located at 62°32′34″S 60°08′42″W which is 1.28 km southeast of Miziya Peak, 4.2 km northeast of Leslie Hill and 6.58 km north of Melnik Peak.

The peak was first mapped in the Bulgarian Tangra 2004/05 topographic survey.

== See also ==
Location of Varna Peninsula in Livingston Island, South Shetland Islands.

- List of Bulgarian toponyms in Antarctica
- Antarctic Place-names Commission

== Maps ==
- L.L. Ivanov et al. Antarctica: Livingston Island and Greenwich Island, South Shetland Islands. Scale 1:100000 topographic map. Sofia: Antarctic Place-names Commission of Bulgaria, 2005.
- L.L. Ivanov. Antarctica: Livingston Island and Greenwich, Robert, Snow and Smith Islands. Scale 1:120000 topographic map. Troyan: Manfred Wörner Foundation, 2009.
- A. Kamburov and L. Ivanov. Bowles Ridge and Central Tangra Mountains: Livingston Island, Antarctica. Scale 1:25000 map. Sofia: Manfred Wörner Foundation, 2023. ISBN 978-619-90008-6-1
