= Teres Ridge =

Ridge in Antarctica

Location of Livingston Island in the South Shetland Islands.

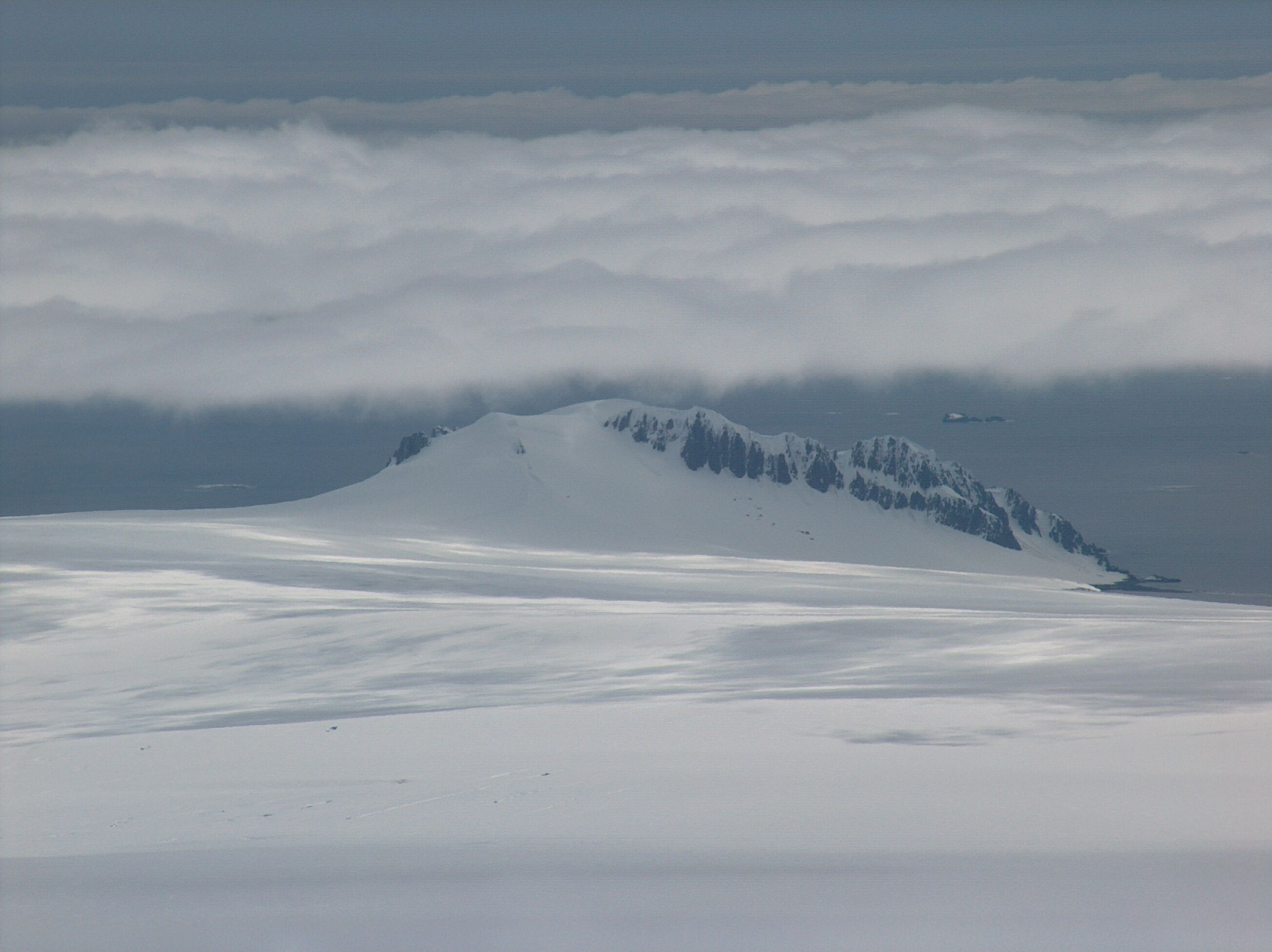
Teres Ridge from Komini Peak.

Topographic map of Livingston Island and Smith Island

Teres Ridge (Hrebet Teres \'hre-bet 'te-res\) is a ridge of elevation 330 m extending 2 km in north-south direction and 1.2 km in east-west direction near Siddins Point on the Hero Bay coast of Livingston Island in the South Shetland Islands, Antarctica surmounting Tundzha Glacier to the southwest and Saedinenie Snowfield to the southeast and east. Ice-free northeastern and northern slopes.

The ridge is named after the Thracian King Teres I, 480-440 BC.

== Location ==
The ridge is located at 62°33′33.5″S 60°24′11″W, which is 2.3 km southeast of Siddins Point, 10.25 km west of Leslie Hill, 10.7 km west-northwest of Hemus Peak, 9.8 km northwest of Rezen Knoll and 9.25 km north of Sinemorets Hill (Bulgarian topographic survey Tangra 2004/05, and mapping in 2005 and 2009).

== Maps ==
- L.L. Ivanov et al. Antarctica: Livingston Island and Greenwich Island, South Shetland Islands. Scale 1:100000 topographic map. Sofia: Antarctic Place-names Commission of Bulgaria, 2005.
- L.L. Ivanov. Antarctica: Livingston Island and Greenwich, Robert, Snow and Smith Islands. Scale 1:120000 topographic map. Troyan: Manfred Wörner Foundation, 2010. ISBN 978-954-92032-9-5 (First edition 2009. ISBN 978-954-92032-6-4)
- Antarctic Digital Database (ADD). Scale 1:250000 topographic map of Antarctica. Scientific Committee on Antarctic Research (SCAR). Since 1993, regularly upgraded and updated.
- L.L. Ivanov. Antarctica: Livingston Island and Smith Island. Scale 1:100000 topographic map. Manfred Wörner Foundation, 2017. ISBN 978-619-90008-3-0
