= Leslie Gap =

Gap on Livingston Island, Antarctica

- Mountain pass
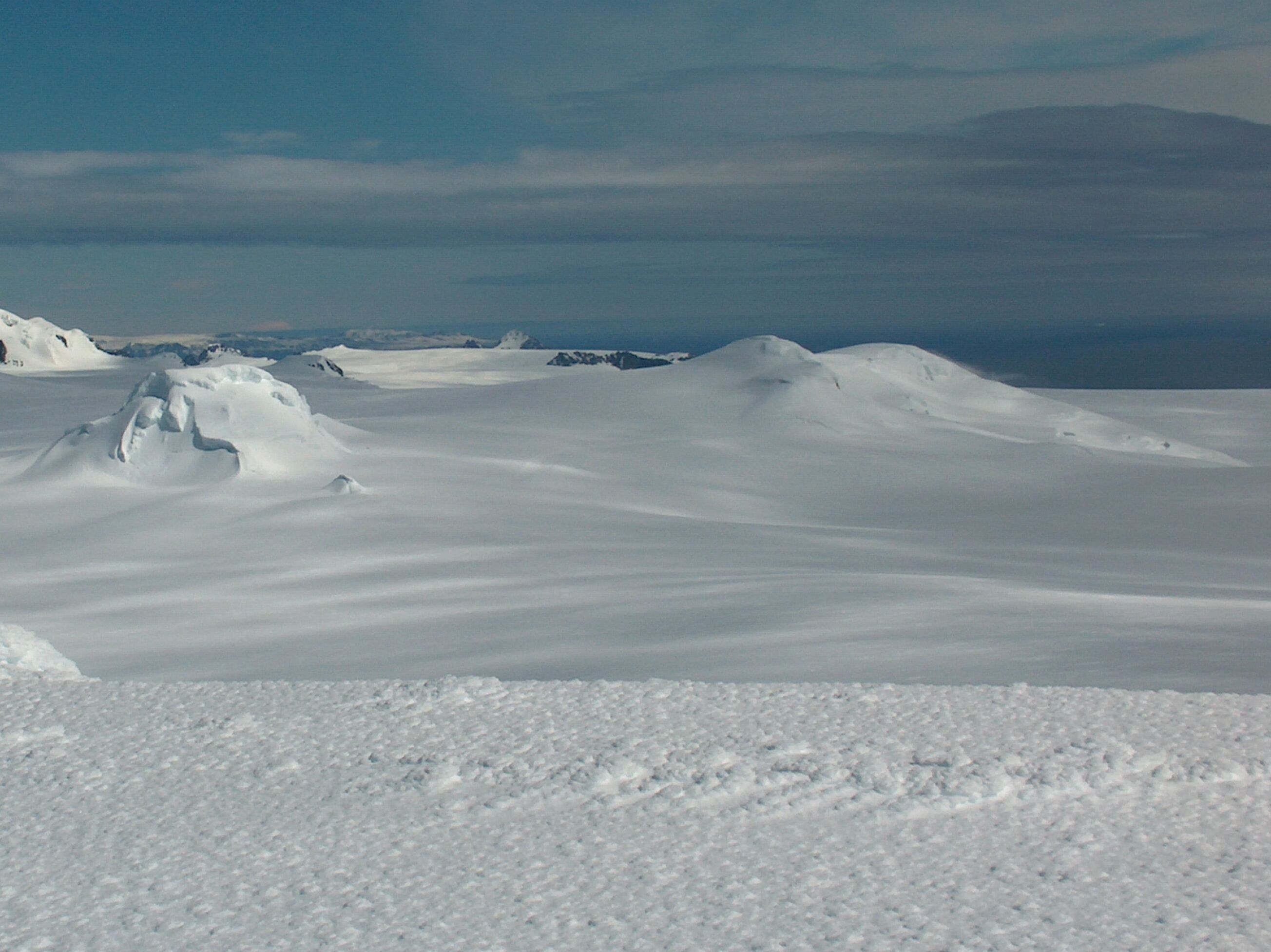
- Leslie Gap from Miziya Peak

- Location within Antarctica
- Coordinates: 62°33′20″S 60°11′50″W
- Location: Livingston Island, South Shetland Islands, Antarctica
- Etymology: Leslie Hill

Dimensions
  - Length: 2.8 m (9.2 ft)
- Elevation: 359 m (1,178 ft)

Leslie Gap (Sedlovina Leslie \se-dlo-vi-'na 'les-li\) is a 359 m (1,178 ft) high ice-covered saddle extending 2.8 m (9.2 ft) in south–north direction between Leslie Hill and Radnevo Peak on Varna Peninsula in northeastern Livingston Island in the South Shetland Islands, Antarctica. The saddle separates the glacial catchments of Kaliakra Glacier to the east and Saedinenie Snowfield to the west. It is part of the overland route from Bowles Ridge to Vidin Heights. The south extremity of the saddle features a minor but conspicuous ice-covered knoll of elevation 404 m (1,325 ft) just north of Leslie Hill. Leslie Gap takes its name from the adjacent Leslie Hill and was first trekked by the Bulgarian Lyubomir Ivanov from Camp Academia on 25 December 2004.

== Location ==
Location of Varna Peninsula on Livingston Island in the South Shetland Islands.

Topographic map of Livingston Island, Greenwich, Robert, Snow and Smith Islands.

The gap is centred at 62°33′20″S 60°11′50″W which is 2.16 m (7.1 ft) north-northeast of the midpoint of Elhovo Gap, 6.1 m (20 ft) north of Omurtag Pass and 1.29 m (4.2 ft) southwest of Miziya Peak (British mapping in 1968, rough Argentine mapping in 1980, and Bulgarian mapping in 2005 and 2009 from the topographic survey Tangra 2004/05).

== Maps ==
- L.L. Ivanov et al. Antarctica: Livingston Island and Greenwich Island, South Shetland Islands. Scale 1:100000 topographic map. Sofia: Antarctic Place-names Commission of Bulgaria, 2005.
- L.L. Ivanov. Antarctica: Livingston Island and Greenwich, Robert, Snow and Smith Islands. Scale 1:120000 topographic map. Troyan: Manfred Wörner Foundation, 2009.
- A. Kamburov and L. Ivanov. Bowles Ridge and Central Tangra Mountains: Livingston Island, Antarctica. Scale 1:25000 map. Sofia: Manfred Wörner Foundation, 2023. ISBN 978-619-90008-6-1
