= Zemen Knoll =

Peak on Livingston Island, Antarctica

Location of Varna Peninsula on Livingston Island in the South Shetland Islands.

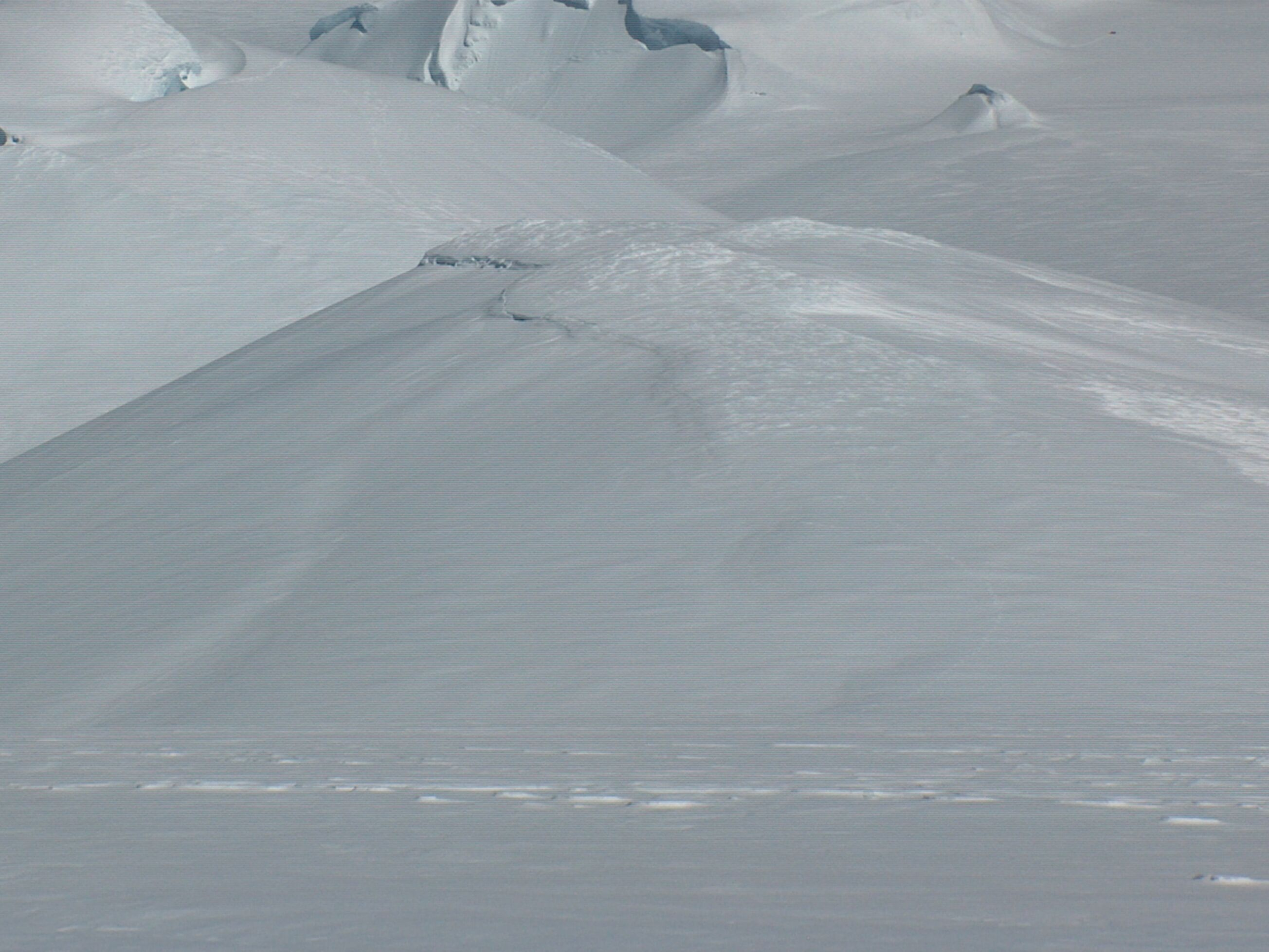
Zemen Knoll from Miziya Peak, with Radnevo Peak and Leslie Hill in the background.

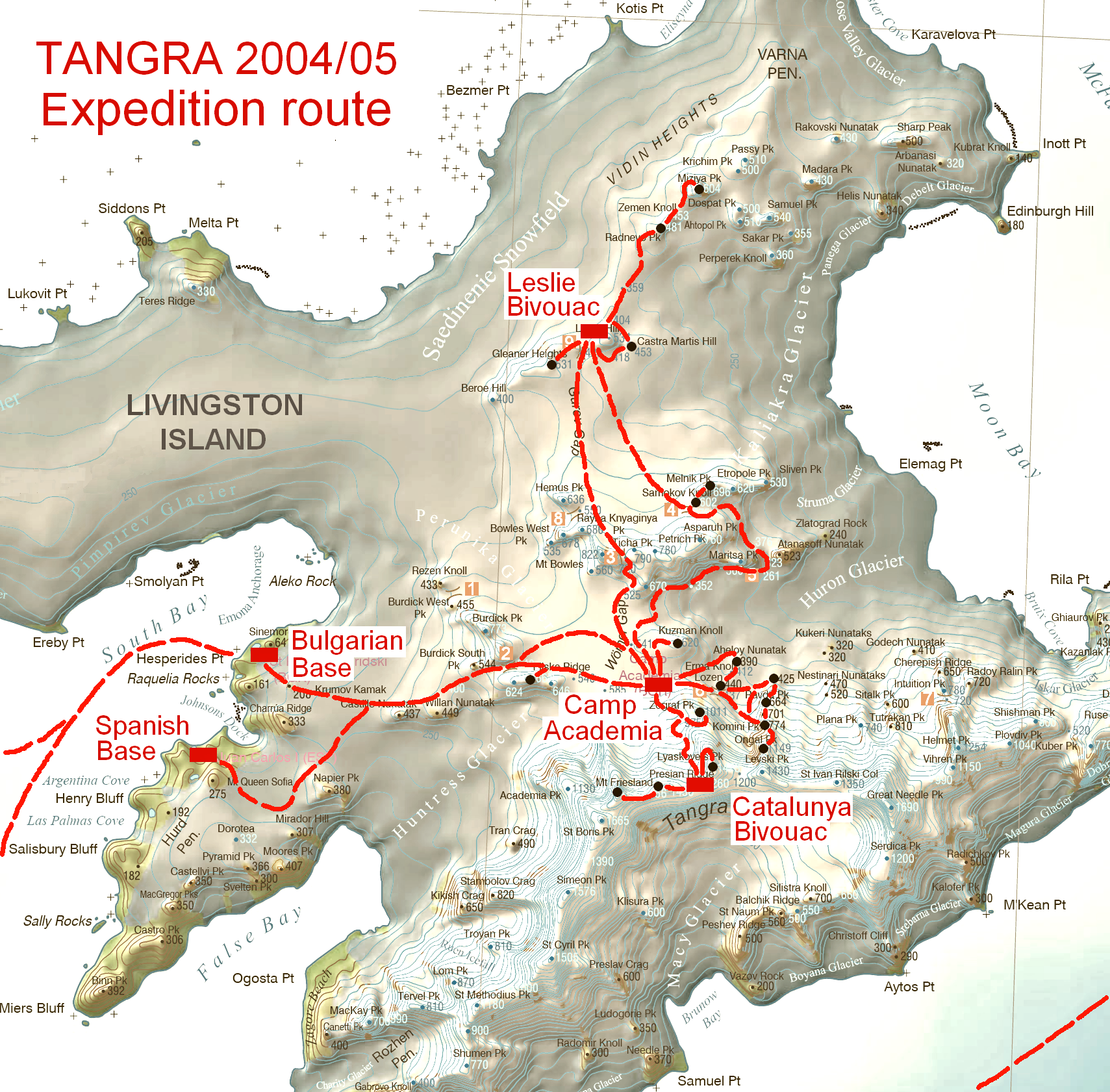
The survey route of Tangra 2004/05 including Zemen Knoll.

Topographic map of Livingston Island and Smith Island

Zemen Knoll (Zemenska Mogila \'ze-men-ska mo-'gi-la\) is a peak of 453 m in the Vidin Heights on Varna Peninsula, Livingston Island in the South Shetland Islands, Antarctica. The knoll overlooks Kaliakra Glacier to the southeast, and Saedinenie Snowfield to the northwest and west. The feature is named after the town of Zemen in Western Bulgaria.

The first ascent was by Lyubomir Ivanov from Camp Academia on 25 December 2004, as part of Tangra 2004/05 survey.

== Location ==
The knoll is located at 62°32′27″S 60°10′33″W, which is 280 m north of Radnevo Peak, 840 m southwest of Miziya Peak and 1.59 km west of Ahtopol Peak.

The knoll was mapped by Bulgaria in 2005 and 2009 from the Tangra topographic survey of 2004/05.

== Maps ==
- L.L. Ivanov et al. Antarctica: Livingston Island and Greenwich Island, South Shetland Islands. Scale 1:100000 topographic map. Sofia: Antarctic Place-names Commission of Bulgaria, 2005.
- L.L. Ivanov. Antarctica: Livingston Island and Greenwich, Robert, Snow and Smith Islands. Scale 1:120000 topographic map. Troyan: Manfred Wörner Foundation, 2010. ISBN 978-954-92032-9-5 (First edition 2009. ISBN 978-954-92032-6-4)
- Antarctic Digital Database (ADD). Scale 1:250000 topographic map of Antarctica. Scientific Committee on Antarctic Research (SCAR). Since 1993, regularly updated.
- L.L. Ivanov. Antarctica: Livingston Island and Smith Island. Scale 1:100000 topographic map. Manfred Wörner Foundation, 2017. ISBN 978-619-90008-3-0
- A. Kamburov and L. Ivanov. Bowles Ridge and Central Tangra Mountains: Livingston Island, Antarctica. Scale 1:25000 map. Sofia: Manfred Wörner Foundation, 2023. ISBN 978-619-90008-6-1
