= Kaliakra Glacier =

Glacier in Antarctica

- Location of Livingston Island in the South Shetland Islands

- Location within South Shetland Islands Location within Antarctica
- Location: Livingston Island; South Shetland Islands
- Coordinates: 62°34′35″S 60°09′30″W
- Length: 4.3 nautical miles (8.0 km; 4.9 mi)
- Width: 3.8 nautical miles (7.0 km; 4.4 mi)
- Thickness: unknown
- Terminus: Moon Bay
- Status: unknown

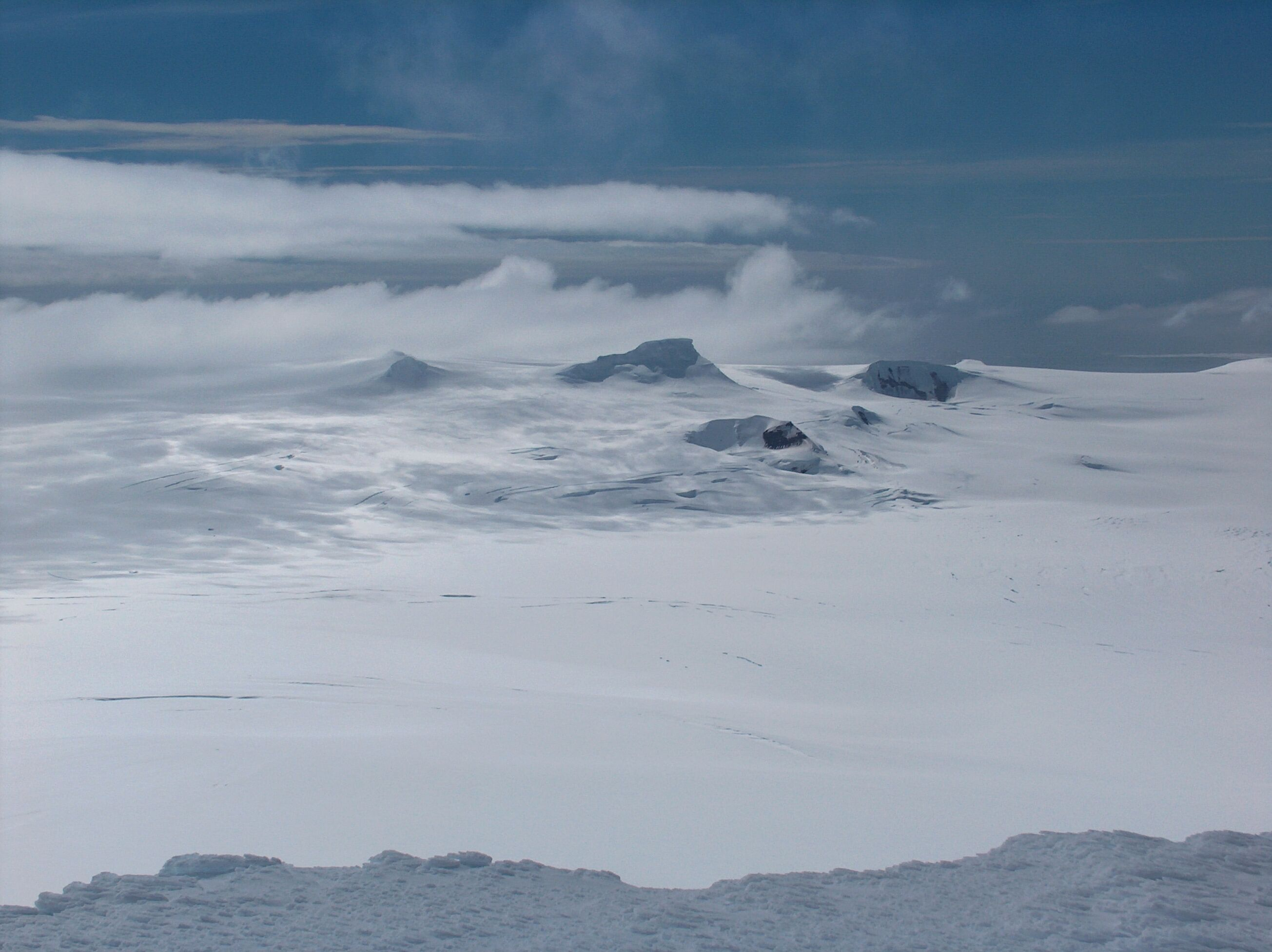
Kaliakra Glacier from Melnik Peak, with Vidin Heights in the background.

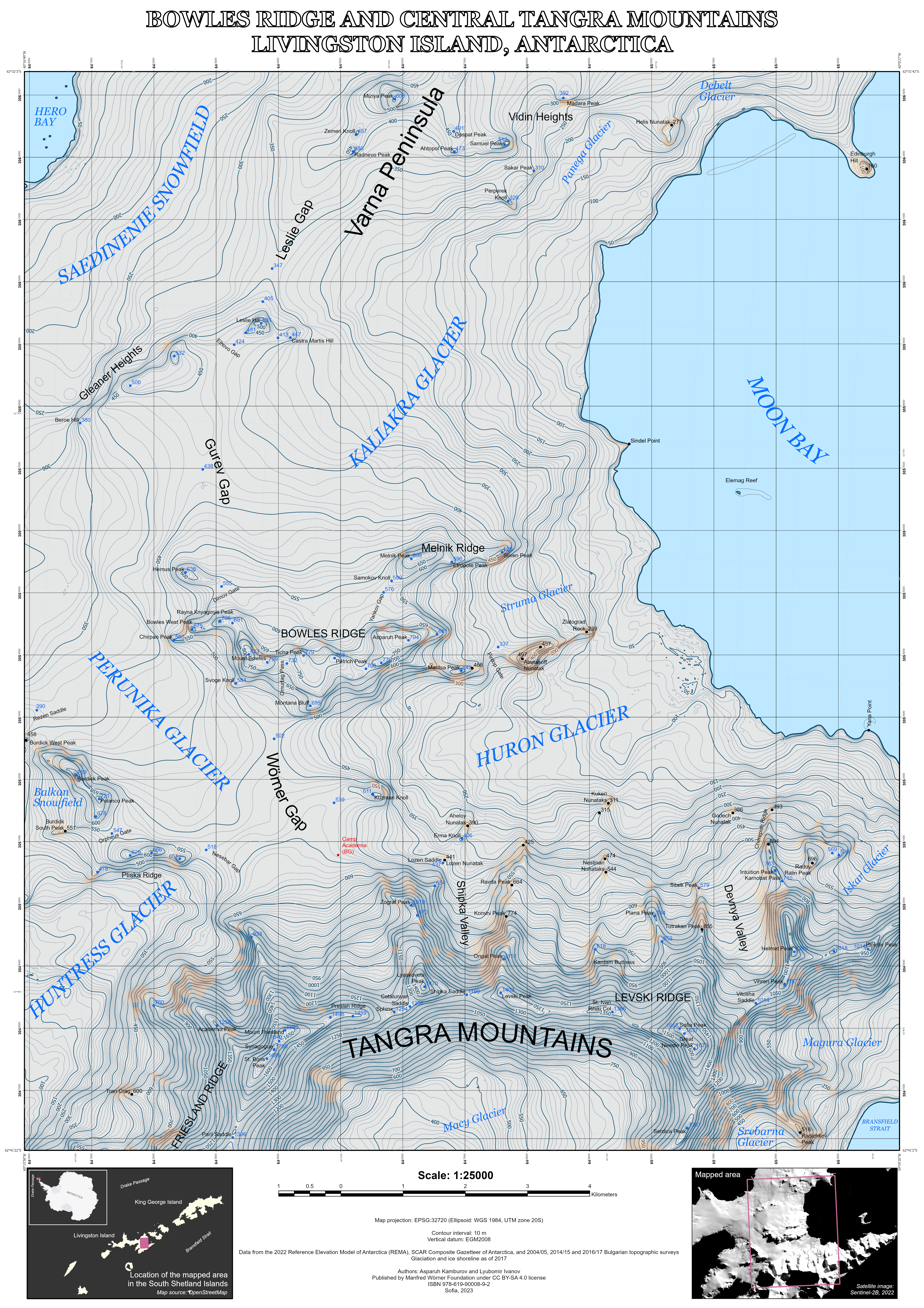
Topographic map of Bowles Ridge and central Tangra Mountains featuring Kaliakra Glacier

Kaliakra Glacier (Bulgarian: ледник Калиакра, romanized: lednik Kaliakra, IPA: [ˈlɛdnik kɐliˈakrɐ]) is a glacier in northeastern Livingston Island, Antarctica extending 3.8 nautical miles (7.0 km; 4.4 mi) in east-west direction and 4.3 nautical miles (8.0 km; 4.9 mi) in north-south direction, and situated southeast of Saedinenie Snowfield, southwest of Panega Glacier, north of Struma Glacier and upper Huron Glacier, and northeast of Perunika Glacier. It is bounded by Melnik Ridge and Bowles Ridge to the south, by Hemus Peak, Gurev Gap, Gleaner Heights, Elhovo Gap, Leslie Hill, Leslie Gap and Radnevo Peak to the west, and Miziya Peak and Samuel Peak to the north. The glacier drains eastwards into Moon Bay south of Perperek Knoll and north of Sindel Point.

The glacier was first crossed by the Bulgarians Lyubomir Ivanov and Doychin Vasilev from Camp Academia on 24 December 2004. Kaliakra, the name of a cape on the Bulgarian Black Sea Coast, was given to the glacier by the Bulgarian Antarctic Place-names Commission, around 1995.

== Location ==
The midpoint of the glacier is located at 62°34′35″S 60°09′30″W. Bulgarian topographic survey Tangra 2004/05 and mapping in 2005 and 2009.

== See also ==
- List of glaciers in the Antarctic
- Glaciology

== Maps ==
- L.L. Ivanov et al. Antarctica: Livingston Island and Greenwich Island, South Shetland Islands. Scale 1:100000 topographic map. Sofia: Antarctic Place-names Commission of Bulgaria, 2005.
- L.L. Ivanov. Antarctica: Livingston Island and Greenwich, Robert, Snow and Smith Islands. Scale 1:120000 topographic map. Troyan: Manfred Wörner Foundation, 2009.
- L.L. Ivanov. Antarctica: Livingston Island and Greenwich, Robert, Snow and Smith Islands. Scale 1:120000 topographic map. Troyan: Manfred Wörner Foundation, 2010. ISBN 978-954-92032-9-5 (First edition 2009. ISBN 978-954-92032-6-4)
- Antarctic Digital Database (ADD). Scale 1:250000 topographic map of Antarctica. Scientific Committee on Antarctic Research (SCAR). Since 1993, regularly upgraded and updated.
- L.L. Ivanov. Antarctica: Livingston Island and Smith Island. Scale 1:100000 topographic map. Manfred Wörner Foundation, 2017. ISBN 978-619-90008-3-0
- A. Kamburov and L. Ivanov. Bowles Ridge and Central Tangra Mountains: Livingston Island, Antarctica. Scale 1:25000 map. Sofia: Manfred Wörner Foundation, 2023. ISBN 978-619-90008-6-1
