= Castra Martis Hill =

Hill in Livingston Island, Antarctica

Location of Livingston Island in the South Shetland Islands.

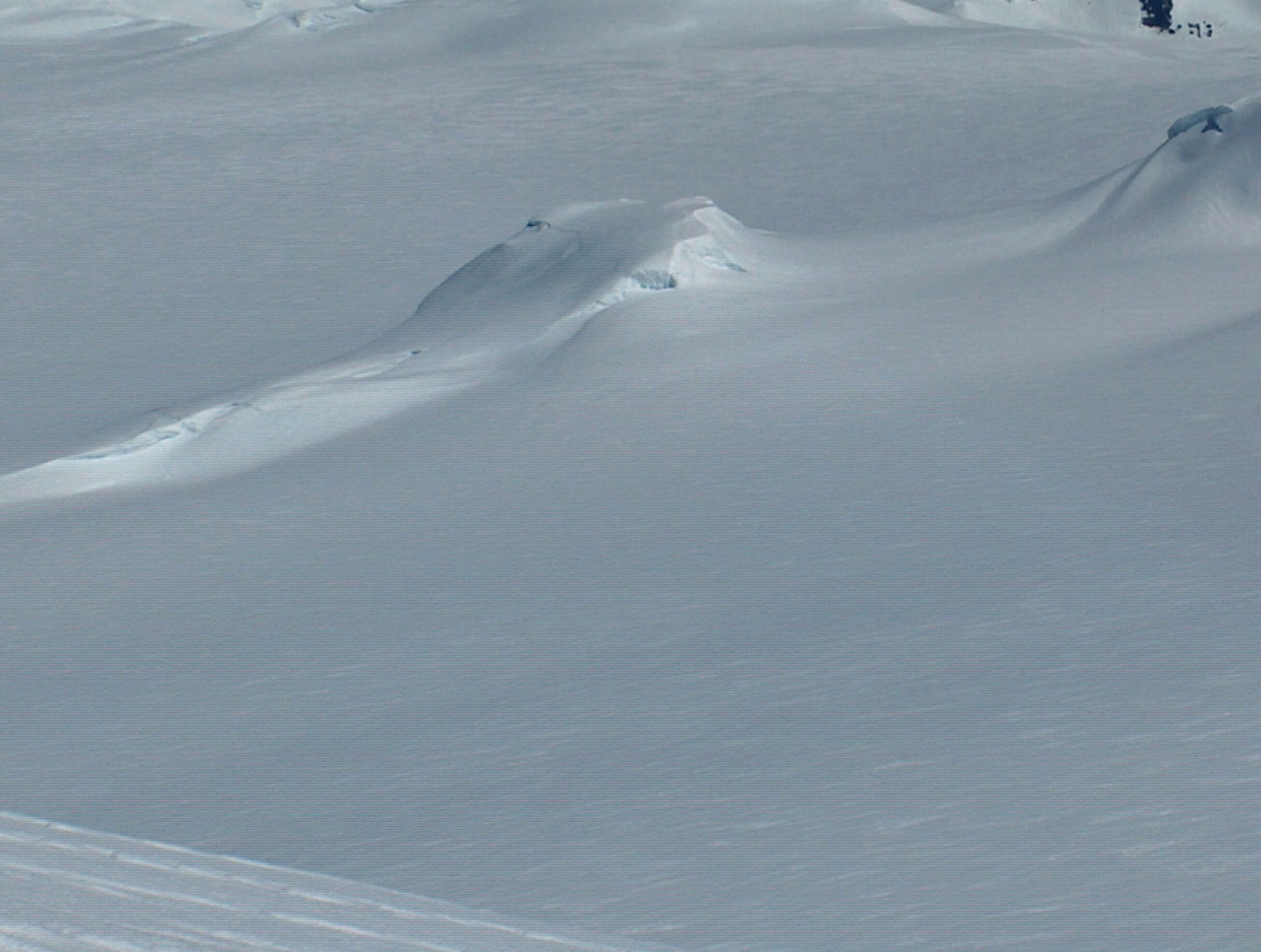
Castra Martis Hill from Miziya Peak.

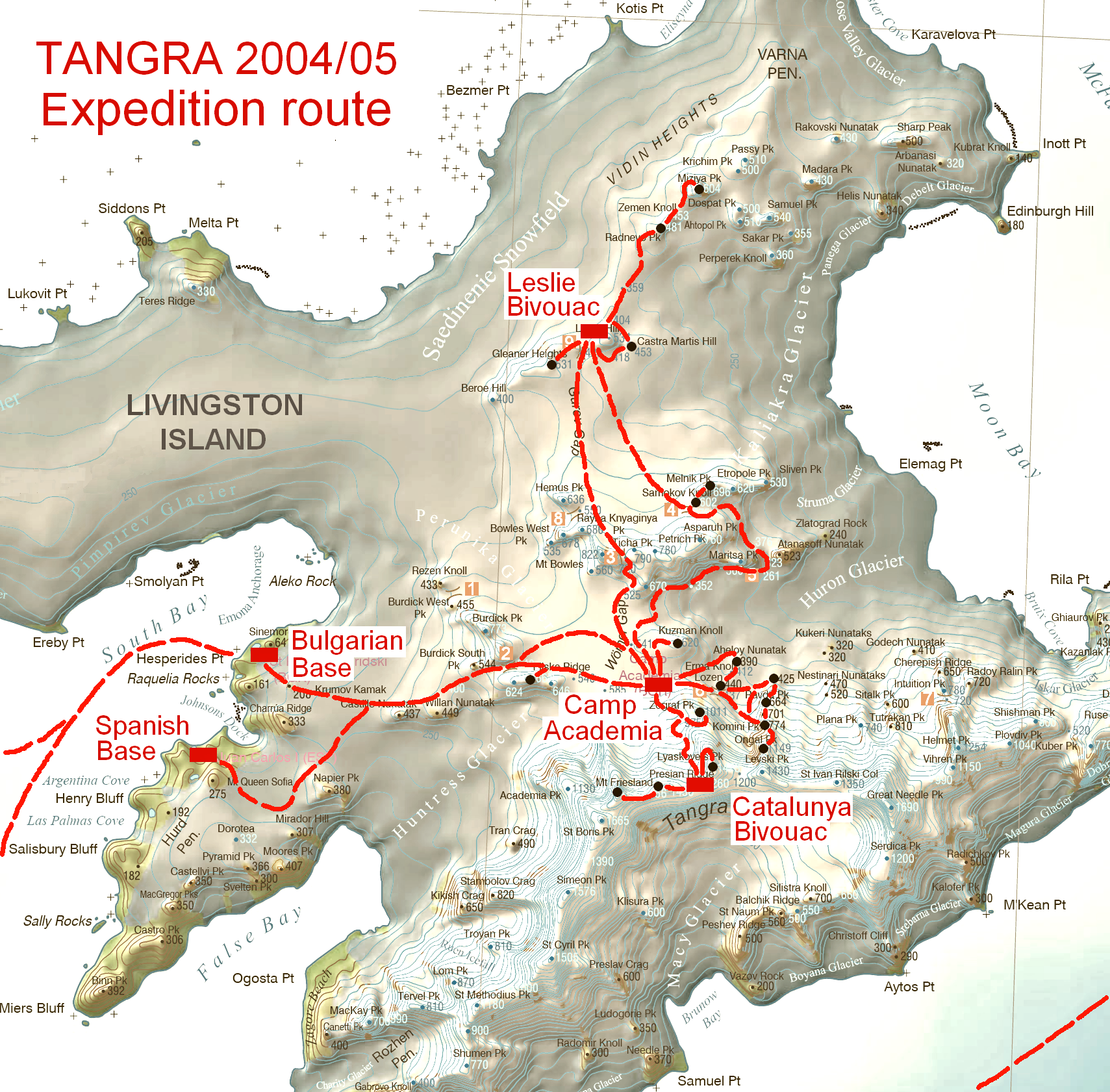
The survey route of Tangra 2004/05 including Castra Martis Hill.

Topographic map of Livingston Island, Greenwich, Robert, Snow and Smith Islands.

Castra Martis Hill (Halm Kastra Martis \'h&lm 'kas-tra 'mar-tis\) is a 453 m hill near Leslie Hill in Livingston Island. The peak was named after the Roman settlement of Castra Martis, ancestor of the present town of Kula in Northwestern Bulgaria.

First ascent by the Bulgarians Lyubomir Ivanov and Doychin Vasilev from Camp Academia on 25 December 2004, as part of Tangra 2004/05 survey.

== Location ==
The hill is located at 62°34′14.4″S 60°11′37.5″W which is 550 m east by southeast of Leslie Hill and the peak is linked to it by a saddle of 418 m elevation.

== Maps ==
- L.L. Ivanov et al. Antarctica: Livingston Island and Greenwich Island, South Shetland Islands. Scale 1:100000 topographic map. Sofia: Antarctic Place-names Commission of Bulgaria, 2005.
- L.L. Ivanov. Antarctica: Livingston Island and Greenwich, Robert, Snow and Smith Islands. Scale 1:120000 topographic map. Troyan: Manfred Wörner Foundation, 2009.
- A. Kamburov and L. Ivanov. Bowles Ridge and Central Tangra Mountains: Livingston Island, Antarctica. Scale 1:25000 map. Sofia: Manfred Wörner Foundation, 2023. ISBN 978-619-90008-6-1
