= Elhovo Gap =

Location of Livingston Island in the South Shetland Islands.

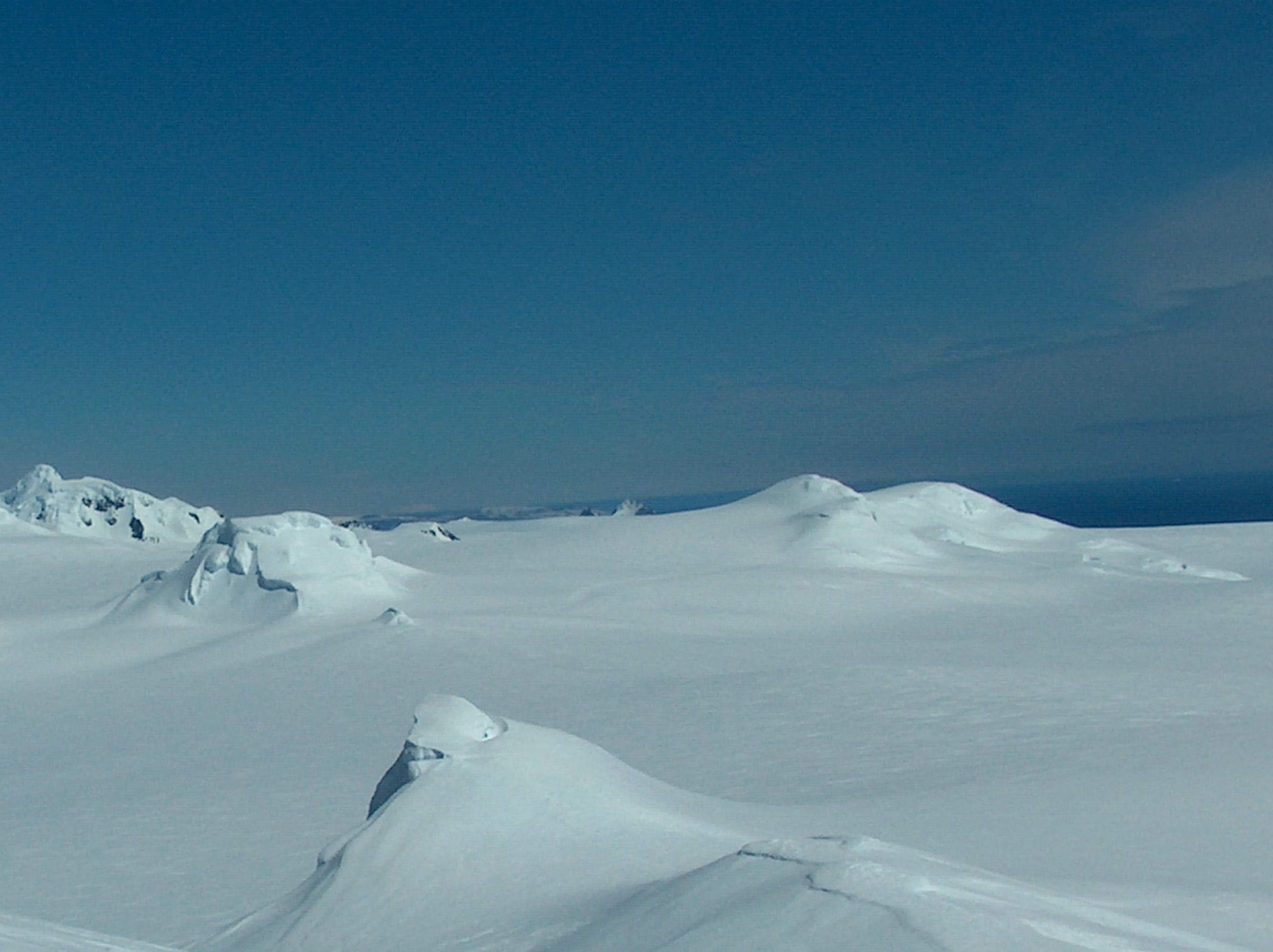
Elhovo Gap from Miziya Peak, with Zemen Knoll, Radnevo Peak and Leslie Gap in the foreground.

Topographic map of Livingston Island, Greenwich, Robert, Snow and Smith Islands.

Elhovo Gap (Elhovska Sedlovina \'el-hov-ska se-dlo-vi-'na\) is a 420 m high saddle extending 1 km (1 mi) in west-southwest–east-northeast direction from Gleaner Heights to Leslie Hill on Livingston Island in the South Shetland Islands of Antarctica, which forms part of the overland route between Bowles Ridge and Vidin Heights. The saddle is named after the Bulgarian town of Elhovo, in association with the artificial Christmas tree ('elha' in Bulgarian) brought by the Tangra 2004/05 Survey team (Lyubomir Ivanov and Doychin Vasilev) to their bivouac at Leslie Hill occupied 24–28 December 2004, making in the process the first crossing of Elhovo Gap.

== Location ==
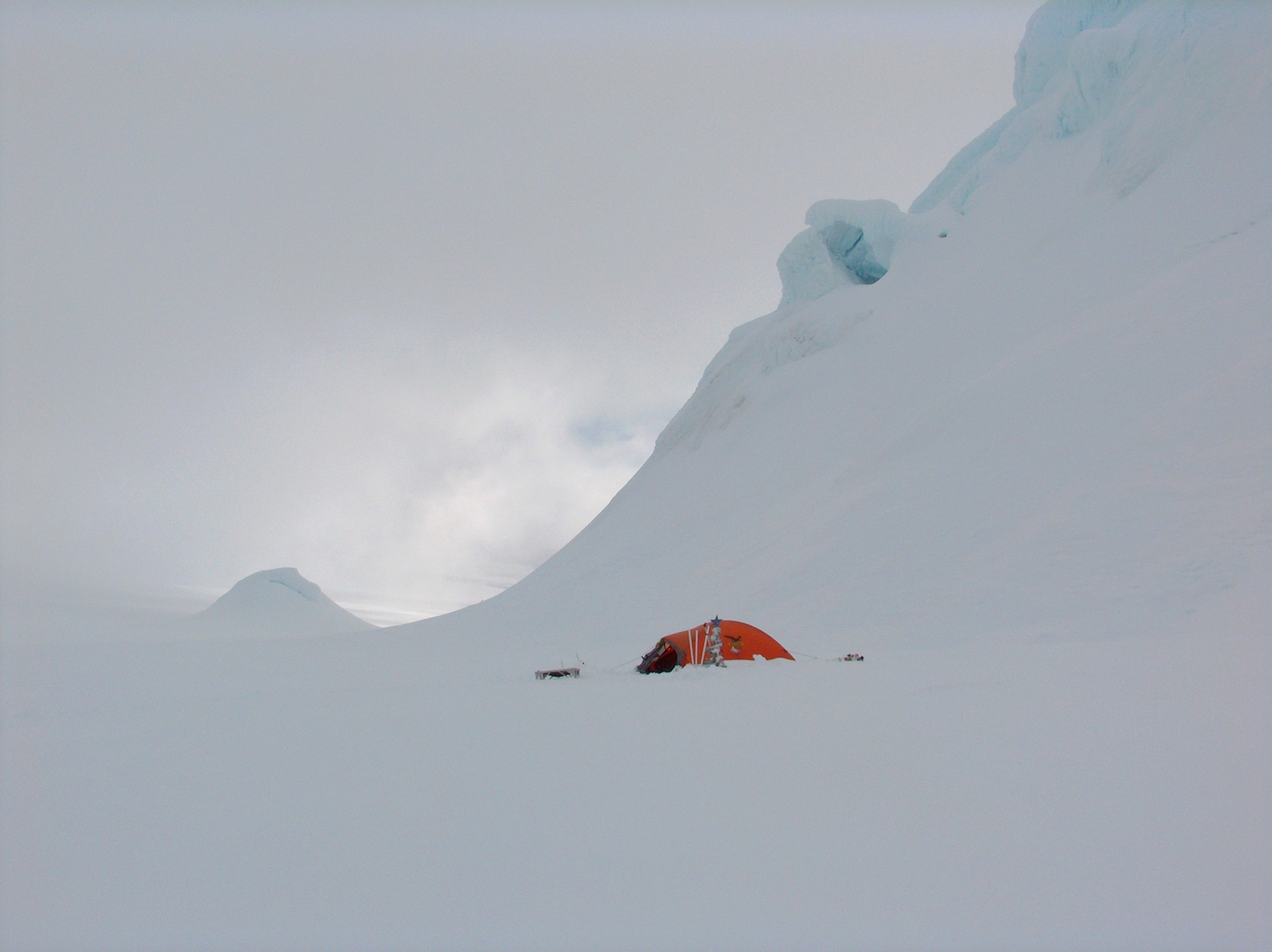
Leslie Hill bivouac from Elhovo Gap.

The gap is centred at 62°34′22″S 60°13′00″W (Bulgarian topographic survey Tangra 2004/05 and mapping in 2005 and 2009).

== Maps ==
- L.L. Ivanov. Antarctica: Livingston Island and Greenwich, Robert, Snow and Smith Islands. Scale 1:120000 topographic map. Troyan: Manfred Wörner Foundation, 2009. ISBN 978-954-92032-6-4
- A. Kamburov and L. Ivanov. Bowles Ridge and Central Tangra Mountains: Livingston Island, Antarctica. Scale 1:25000 map. Sofia: Manfred Wörner Foundation, 2023. ISBN 978-619-90008-6-1
