= Radnevo Peak =

Peak in Antarctica

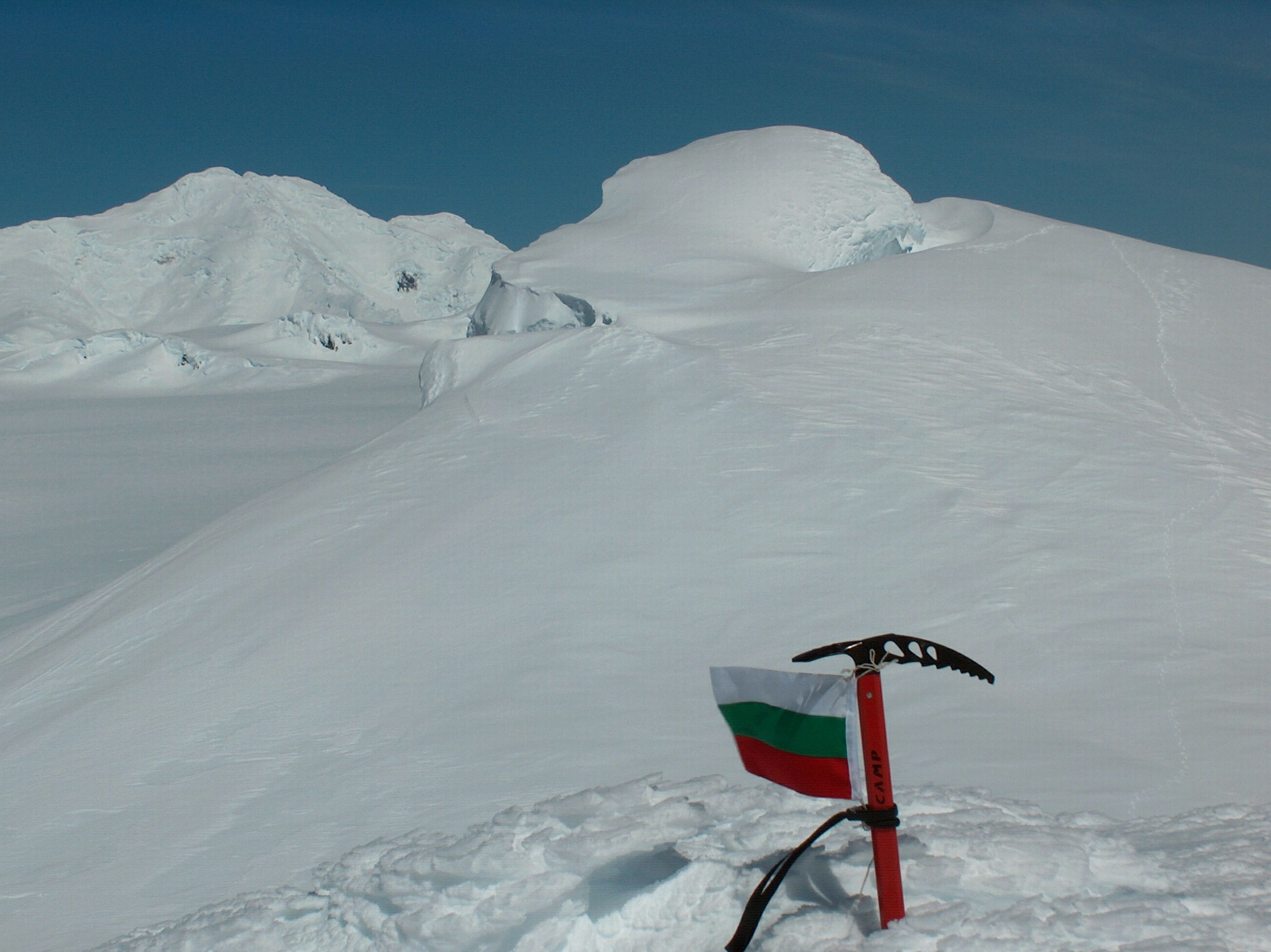
- Radnevo Peak from Zemen Knoll

Highest point
- Elevation: 481 m (1,578 ft)

Naming
- Etymology: named for Radnevo, Bulgaria

Geography
- Location within South Shetland Islands
- Location: Antarctica, South Shetland Islands
- Parent range: Vidin Heights

Location of Varna Peninsula on Livingston Island in the South Shetland Islands.

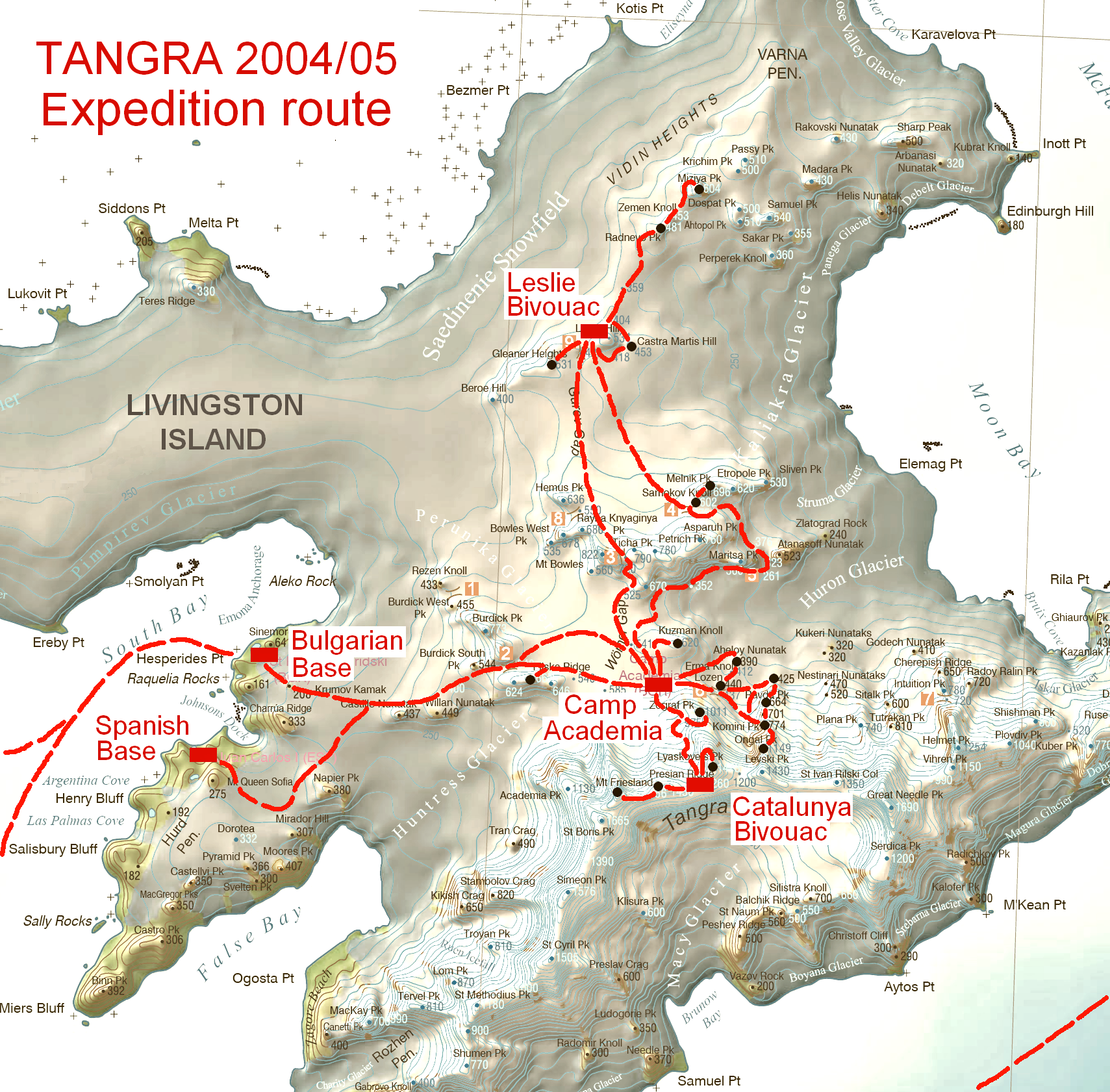
The survey route of Tangra 2004/05 including Radnevo Peak.

Topographic map of Livingston Island and Smith Island

Radnevo Peak (Bulgarian: връх Раднево, romanized: vrah Radnevo, IPA: [ˈvrɤx ˈradnɛvo]) is a peak of elevation 481 m forming the southwest extremity of Vidin Heights on Varna Peninsula on Livingston Island in the South Shetland Islands, Antarctica. Surmounting Kaliakra Glacier to the southeast and Saedinenie Snowfield to the northwest. Linked to Leslie Hill by Leslie Gap. The peak is named after the town of Radnevo in Southeastern Bulgaria.

First ascent by Lyubomir Ivanov from Camp Academia on 25 December 2004, as part of Tangra 2004/05 survey.

== Location ==
The peak is located at 62°32′36.4″S 60°10′37″W which is 1.08 km southwest of Miziya Peak, 2.42 km west of Samuel Peak, 6.61 km north-northwest of Melnik Peak and 3.16 km north-northeast of Leslie Hill (Bulgarian mapping in 2005 and 2009 from the Tangra 2004/05 topographic survey).

== Maps ==
- L.L. Ivanov et al. Antarctica: Livingston Island and Greenwich Island, South Shetland Islands. Scale 1:100000 topographic map. Sofia: Antarctic Place-names Commission of Bulgaria, 2005.
- L.L. Ivanov. Antarctica: Livingston Island and Greenwich, Robert, Snow and Smith Islands. Scale 1:120000 topographic map. Troyan: Manfred Wörner Foundation, 2010. ISBN 978-954-92032-9-5 (First edition 2009. ISBN 978-954-92032-6-4)
- Antarctic Digital Database (ADD). Scale 1:250000 topographic map of Antarctica. Scientific Committee on Antarctic Research (SCAR). Since 1993, regularly updated.
- L.L. Ivanov. Antarctica: Livingston Island and Smith Island. Scale 1:100000 topographic map. Manfred Wörner Foundation, 2017. ISBN 978-619-90008-3-0
- A. Kamburov and L. Ivanov. Bowles Ridge and Central Tangra Mountains: Livingston Island, Antarctica. Scale 1:25000 map. Sofia: Manfred Wörner Foundation, 2023. ISBN 978-619-90008-6-1
