= Ahtopol =

Ahtopol Ахтопол
- Town
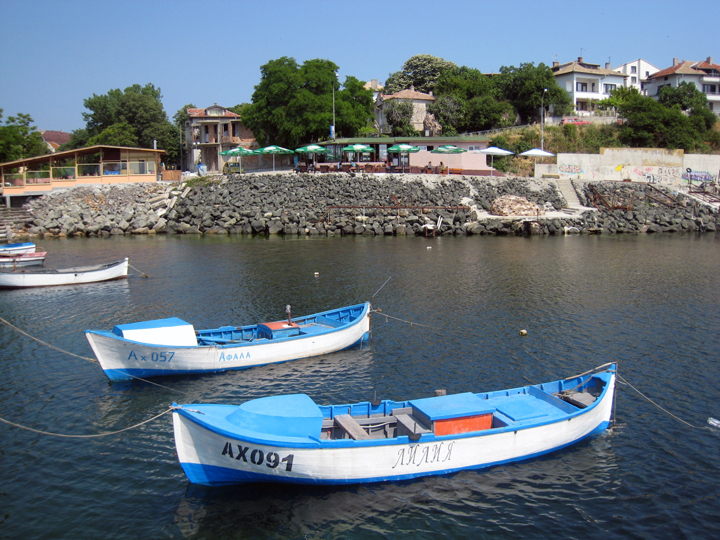
- Ahtopol's Port

- Location of Ahtopol within Bulgaria
- Coordinates: 42°6′N 27°57′E
- Country: Bulgaria
- Province: Burgas
- Municipality: Tsarevo

Government
  - Mayor: Stanislav Georgiev Dimitrov (GERB)

Area
  - Total: 28,704 km^{2} (11,083 sq mi)
- Elevation: 0 m (0 ft)

Population (2022)
  - Total: 1,286
  - Density: 0.04480/km^{2} (0.1160/sq mi)
- Time zone: UTC+2 (EET)
  - Summer (DST): UTC+3 (EEST)
- Postal Code: 8280
- Area code: 0590

Ahtopol (Bulgarian: Ахтопол [axˈtɔpoɫ], Greek: Αγαθούπολη) is a town and seaside resort on the southern Bulgarian Black Sea Coast.

== Geography ==
=== Location ===
It is located on a headland in the southeastern part of Burgas Province and is close to the border with European Turkey. It is the southernmost town on the Bulgarian coast. Ahtopol lies within Strandzha Nature Park.

=== Climate ===
Ahtopol has a humid subtropical climate (Köppen climate classification: Cfa) bordering with a mediterranean climate (Csa) with limited continental effects.

Month	Low Temperature (°C)	High Temperature (°C)
January	1.6	8.5
February	2.3	10.2
March	4.2	12.3
April	7.8	15.5
May	13.5	21.5
June	17.8	25.7
July	20.1	28.0
August	20.2	28.2
September	16.7	24.1
October	12.1	19.5
November	8.0	14.6
December	3.3	10.7

Climate chart - link to Weather atlas:

Climate data for Ahtopol (NIMH−BAS) 1991–2020 normals
Month	Jan	Feb	Mar	Apr	May	Jun	Jul	Aug	Sep	Oct	Nov	Dec	Year
Daily mean °C (°F)	4.2 (39.6)	4.9 (40.8)	7.4 (45.3)	11.1 (52.0)	15.8 (60.4)	20.4 (68.7)	23.2 (73.8)	23.3 (73.9)	19.5 (67.1)	15.0 (59.0)	10.1 (50.2)	6.1 (43.0)	13.4 (56.1)
Source: Stringmeteo.com, Climatebase.ru (precipitation days and extremes), NOAA, freemeteo.bg and Weather Atlas

Climate data for Tsarevo, precipitation
Month	Jan	Feb	Mar	Apr	May	Jun	Jul	Aug	Sep	Oct	Nov	Dec	Year
Daily mean °C (°F)	4.2 (39.6)	4.9 (40.8)	7.4 (45.3)	11.1 (52.0)	15.8 (60.4)	20.4 (68.7)	23.2 (73.8)	23.3 (73.9)	19.5 (67.1)	13.4 (56.1)	10.1 (50.2)	6.1 (43.0)	13.4 (56.1)
Average precipitation mm (inches)	67 (2.6)	52 (2.0)	56 (2.2)	46 (1.8)	46 (1.8)	41 (1.6)	27 (1.1)	28 (1.1)	46 (1.8)	79 (3.1)	86 (3.4)	80 (3.1)	655 (25.8)
Source: Climate of Strandja-Sakar, Kl.Ohridski University press, Sofia, 1990; Topliiski - Vekilska

The climate is suitable for subtropical crops and fruits: fig, olive, kiwi, bay laurel, and cork oak.; Many exotic and ornamental plants thrive in this climate: Washingtonia filifera, Butia capitata, and Trachycarpus palms are grown in private plots, Japanese hardy bananas and bamboo, Mediterranean cypress, maritime pines, and Atlas cedar are cultivated all around the town and vicinity. Ahtopol has the largest plantation of persimmon and pomegranate in the country.

Places of interests:

Botanical garden 'Serafimov' - village of Velika;

Botanical living collection - Georgi Bachvarov - village of Varvara;

Private Botanical garden - Dr. Gaidurkov - village of Sinemorets;

== History ==
The town lies on the site of an ancient Thracian settlement, with the earliest traces of human settlement dating to the Neolithic. It was probably colonized by the Ancient Greeks around 440-430 BC. According to researchers the city was founded by Athenians. The Romans called it Peronticus, while the Byzantine leader Agathon reconstructed the town after barbarian invasions and possibly gave it his own name, Agathopolis (Greek: Αγαθόπολις). According to other sources, it was named thus as early as 323 BC. Another name it bore anciently was Aulaiouteichos or Alaeouteichos. Arab geographer al-Idrisi mentions Ahtopol in his memoirs as a remarkable hub and famous city.

In the Middle Ages, the town frequently changed hands between the Byzantine Empire and the Bulgarian Empire. Medieval sources mention Ahtopol as a lively merchant port where many Byzantine, Italian and other ships arrived. With the invasion of the Ottoman troops at the end of the 14th century, the town was called Ahtenbolu. The town ultimately fell under Ottoman rule as late as 1453. An Ottoman tax register of 1498 lists 158 Christian families in Ahtopol, most of which have Greek names but others evidently Slavic (Bulgarian). In 1898, Ahtopol was a town of 410 houses, of which 300 Greek and 110 Bulgarian. In the 19th century, it was still a thriving centre of fishery and overseas trade, with many locals owning their own ships and selling goods all around the Black Sea and the Mediterranean. Viticulture was also well-developed.

Ahtopol has been burnt down and devastated by sea pirates (often the Caucasian Lazi) many times, with the most recent fire being in 1918, when the town was almost destroyed. Remains of the town's fortress (reaching up to 8 m in height and 3.5 m in width), the 12th-century monastery of St Yani and a fountain with a carved horseman are the only traces left from ancient times. Another landmark is the Church of the Ascension from 1796. Ahtopol was a kaza centre in Kırkkilise sanjak of Edirne Vilayet between 1878 and 1912 as "Ahtabolu" (Ahtopol was referred as Agathoupolis in reference page). Also, Evliya Çelebi passed from here in 1663 and referred as "Ahtabolu" in 6th volume (English of "6. Cilt") of Seyahatname.

After the Balkan Wars, when the area was ceded to Bulgaria by the Ottoman Empire, the town's predominantly Greek population gradually moved to Greece and was replaced by Bulgarian refugees, mostly from Eastern Thrace, specifically Bunarhisar (150 families). The Greek name of the town was Achtòpolis, Αχτοπολις or Agathùpolis, Αγαθουπολις.

== Rocketry ==
From 1984 to 1990 28 soundings rockets of the Soviet type M-100 were launched near Ahtopol at 42°5'8"N 27°57'17"E.

== Honour ==
Ahtopol Peak in Antarctica is named after the town.

== Notable people ==
- professor Kosta Dimitrov Pergelov (1921 – 2007), economist
- Doctor Georgi Atanasov Kasabaliev

(1937-2003) Medical Doctor

== See also ==
- Ahtopol Peak
