= Radnevo =

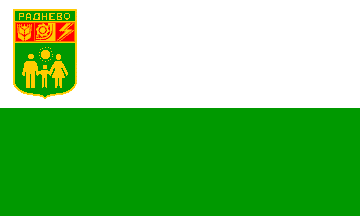
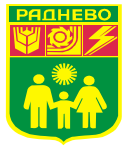
- Flag Coat of arms

- Location of Radnevo
- Coordinates: 42°18′N 25°56′E
- Country: Bulgaria
- Province (Oblast): Stara Zagora

Government
  - Кмет: Георги Георгиев - Маджара
- Elevation: 113 m (371 ft)

Population (31.12.2009)
  - Total: 13,384
- Time zone: UTC+2 (EET)
  - Summer (DST): UTC+3 (EEST)
- Postal Code: 6260
- Area code: 0417

Radnevo (Bulgarian: Раднево Bulgarian pronunciation: [ˈradnɛvo]) is a town in southern Bulgaria, part of Stara Zagora Province, located in the eastern Upper Thracian Lowlands. It is the administrative centre of the homonymous Radnevo Municipality. As of December 2009, the town had a population of 13,384.

The far east corner of Radnevo is the location of the Maritsa Iztok-2 power station. This power station was ranked as the industrial facility that is causing the highest damage costs to health and the environment in Bulgaria and the entire European Union.

Notable natives include Bulgarian Agrarian National Union politician Dimitar Dragiev (1869–1943), poet Geo Milev (1895–1925), Bulgarian international footballer Andrey Zhelyazkov (b. 1952).

== Honour ==
Radnevo Peak on Livingston Island in the South Shetland Islands, Antarctica is named after Radnevo.
