= Saedinenie Snowfield =

Snowfield in the South Shetland Islands, Antarctica

Location of Livingston Island in the South Shetland Islands.

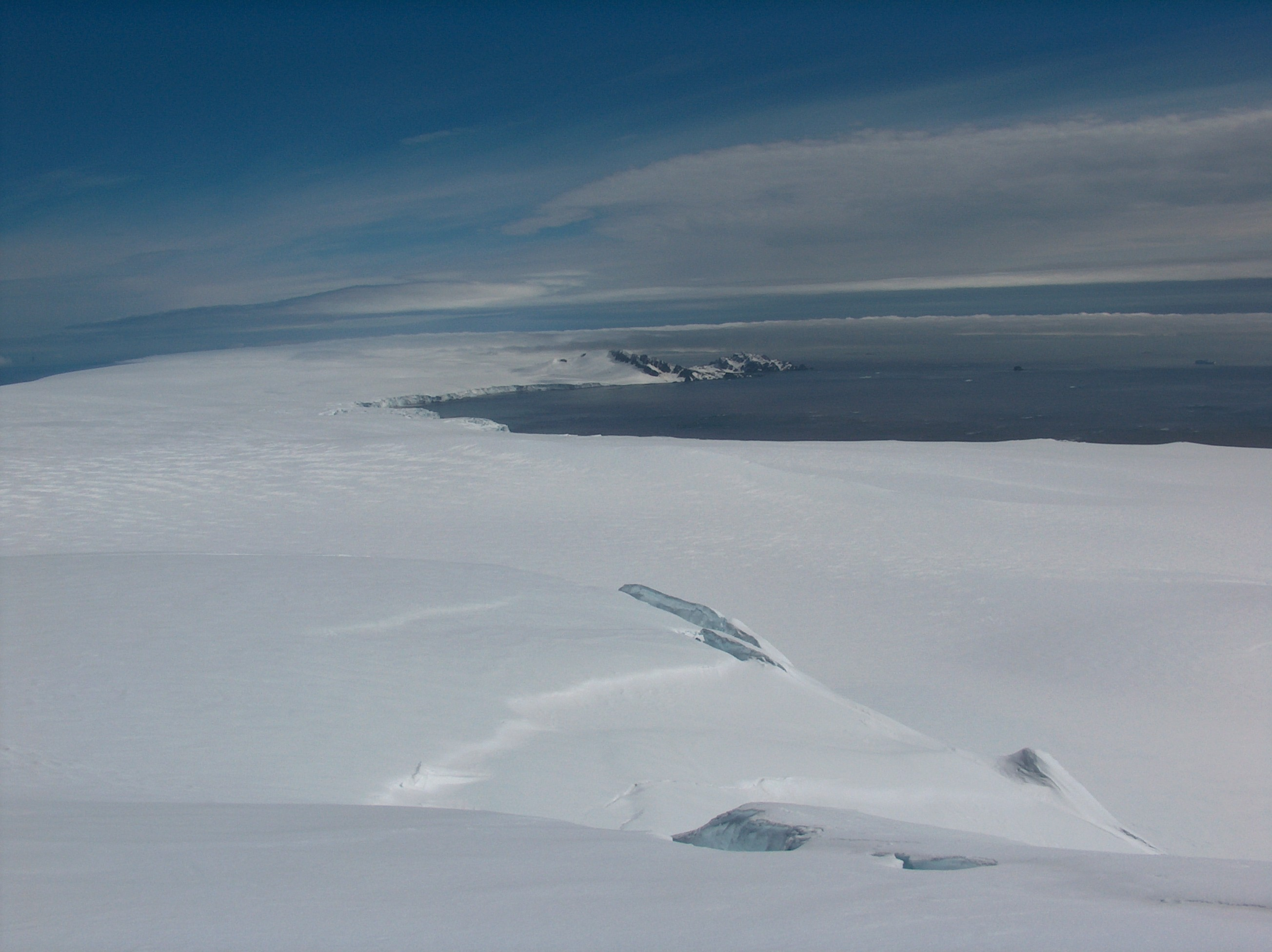
Saedinenie Snowfield from Miziya Peak, with Teres Ridge in the background.

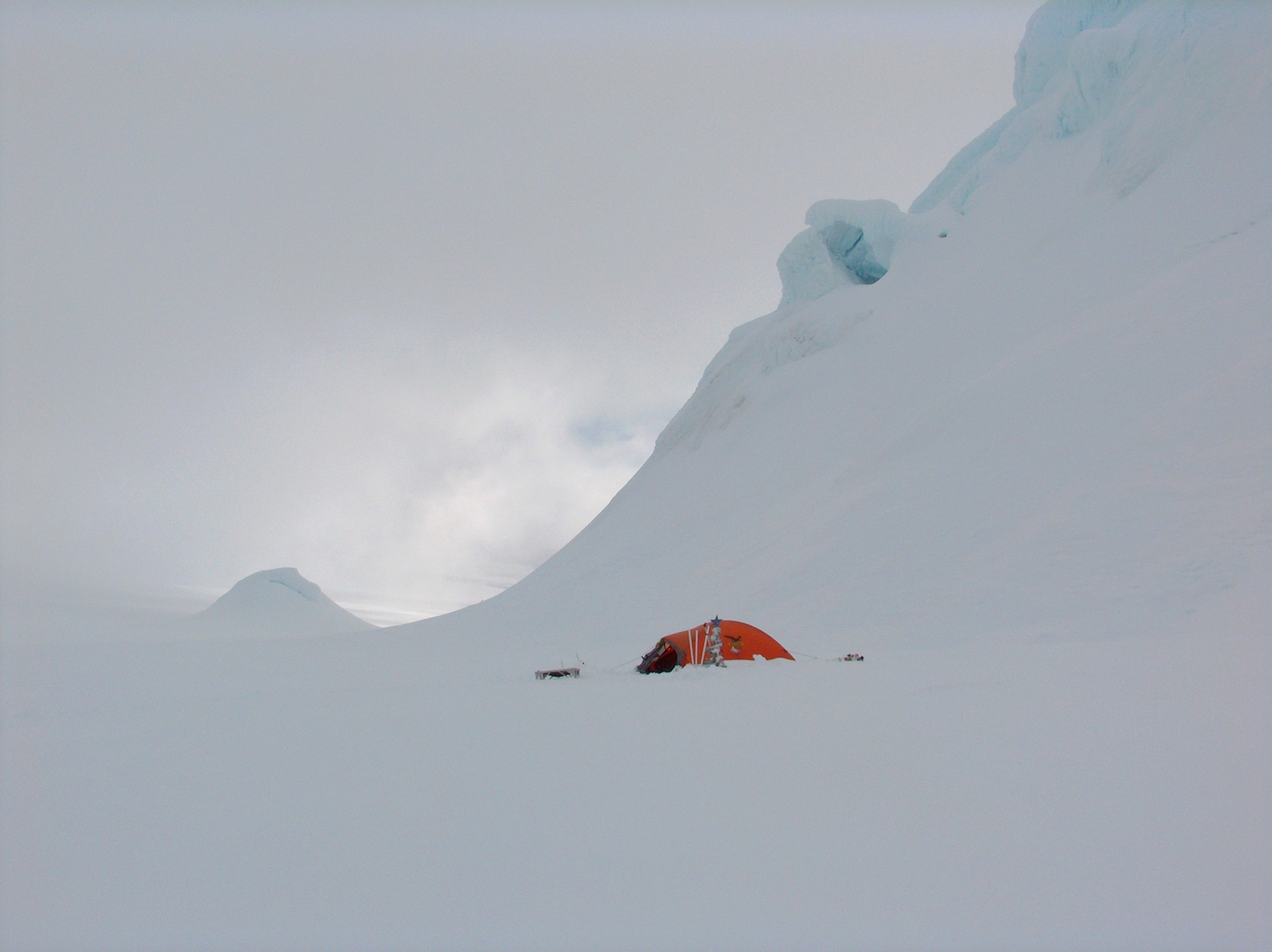
The Tangra 2004/05 survey bivouac on Saedinenie Snowfield, by Leslie Hill.

Topographic map of Livingston Island and Smith Island

Saedinenie Snowfield (Bulgarian: ледник Съединение, romanized: lednik Saedinenie, IPA: [ˈlɛdnik sɐɛdiˈnɛniɛ]) on Livingston Island in the South Shetland Islands, Antarctica is situated southwest of Rose Valley Glacier, west of Panega Glacier, northwest of Kaliakra Glacier, north of lower Perunika Glacier and east-northeast of Tundzha Glacier. It is bounded by Teres Ridge to the west, the glacial divide between the Drake Passage and Bransfield Strait to the south, Gleaner Heights, Elhovo Gap and Leslie Hill to the southeast, and Leslie Gap and Vidin Heights to the east. The snowfield extends 4.7 km inland and 15.5 km in southwest-northeast direction, and drains into Hero Bay between Melta Point and Slab Point.

A survey bivouac in eastern Saedinenie Snowfield near Leslie Hill was occupied 24–28 December 2004.

The feature was named after the Bulgarian town of Saedinenie ('Reunification'), in association with the 120th anniversary of the Reunification of the Principality of Bulgaria and the province of Eastern Rumelia in 1885. This is one of the Bulgarian names bestowed on hitherto nameless geographical features by the Tangra 2004/05 Expedition.

== Location ==
The snowfield is centred at 62°32′36″S 60°13′38″W (Bulgarian topographic survey Tangra 2004/05 and mapping in 2005 and 2009).

== Maps ==
- L.L. Ivanov et al. Antarctica: Livingston Island and Greenwich Island, South Shetland Islands. Scale 1:100000 topographic map. Sofia: Antarctic Place-names Commission of Bulgaria, 2005.
- L.L. Ivanov. Antarctica: Livingston Island and Greenwich, Robert, Snow and Smith Islands. Scale 1:120000 topographic map. Troyan: Manfred Wörner Foundation, 2010. ISBN 978-954-92032-9-5 (First edition 2009. ISBN 978-954-92032-6-4)
- Antarctic Digital Database (ADD). Scale 1:250000 topographic map of Antarctica. Scientific Committee on Antarctic Research (SCAR). Since 1993, regularly upgraded and updated.
- L.L. Ivanov. Antarctica: Livingston Island and Smith Island. Scale 1:100000 topographic map. Manfred Wörner Foundation, 2017. ISBN 978-619-90008-3-0
- A. Kamburov and L. Ivanov. Bowles Ridge and Central Tangra Mountains: Livingston Island, Antarctica. Scale 1:25000 map. Sofia: Manfred Wörner Foundation, 2023. ISBN 978-619-90008-6-1
