= Tangra 2004/05 =

Bulgarian geographical expedition to Antarctica

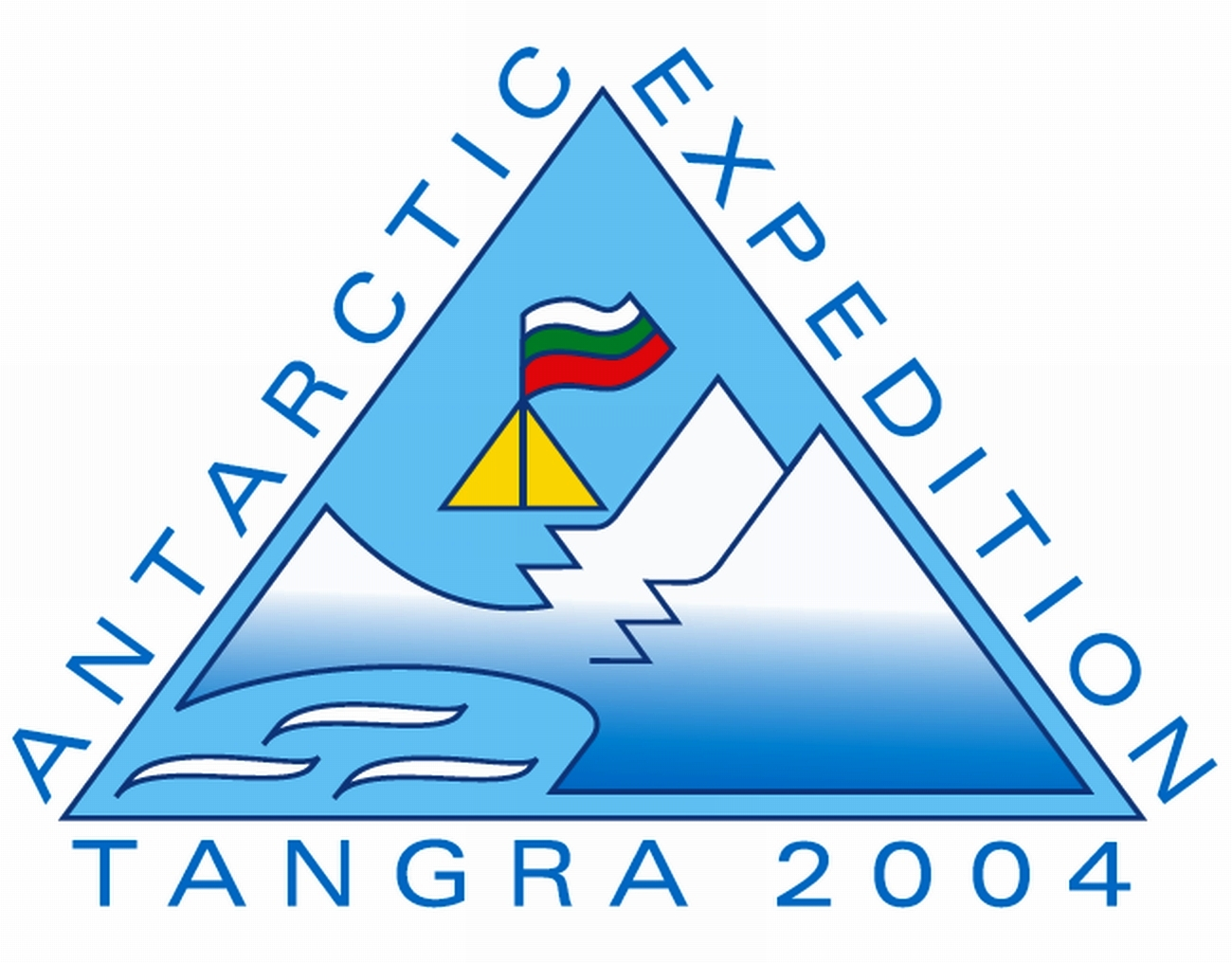
Expedition logo

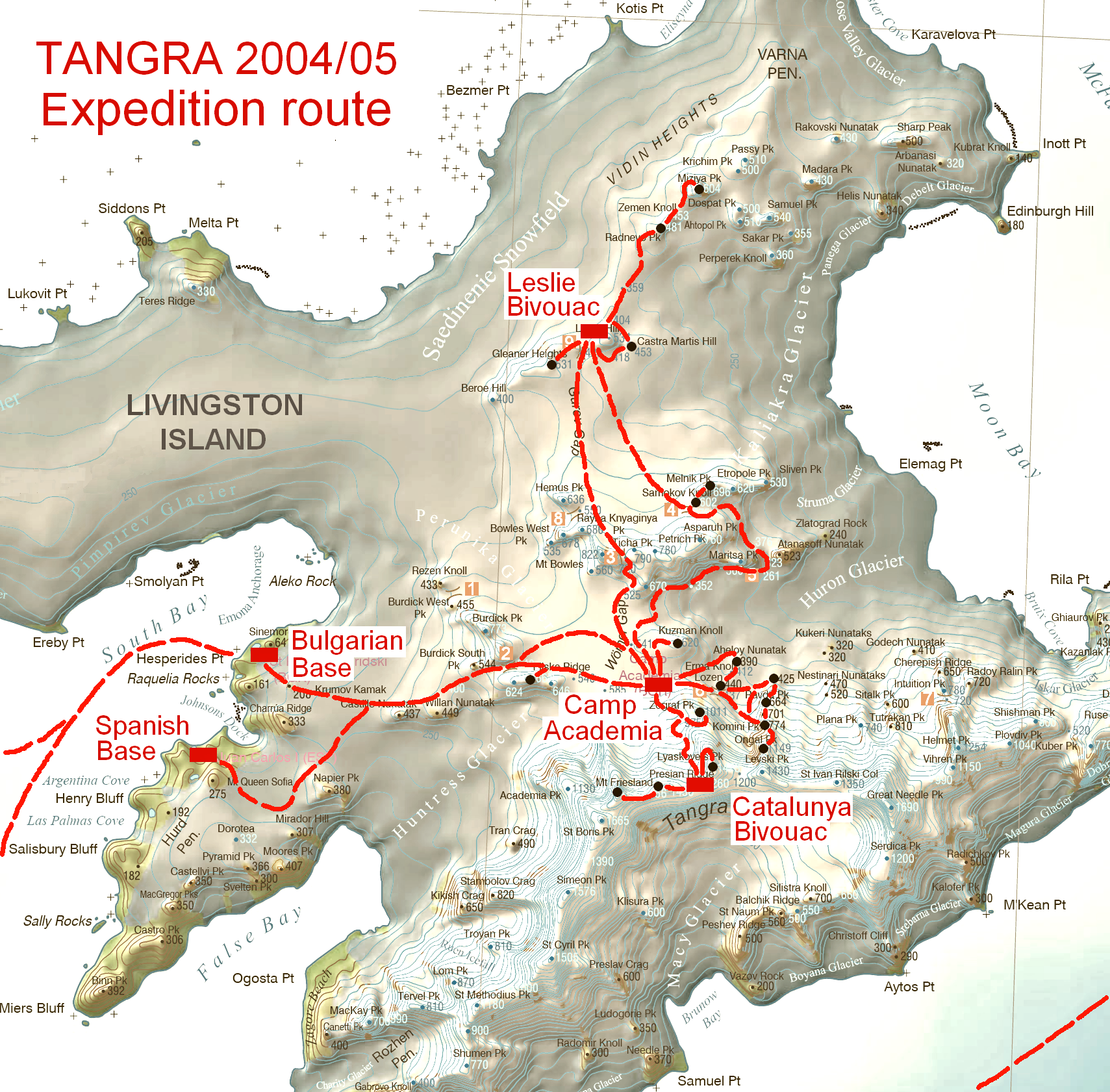
Expedition route

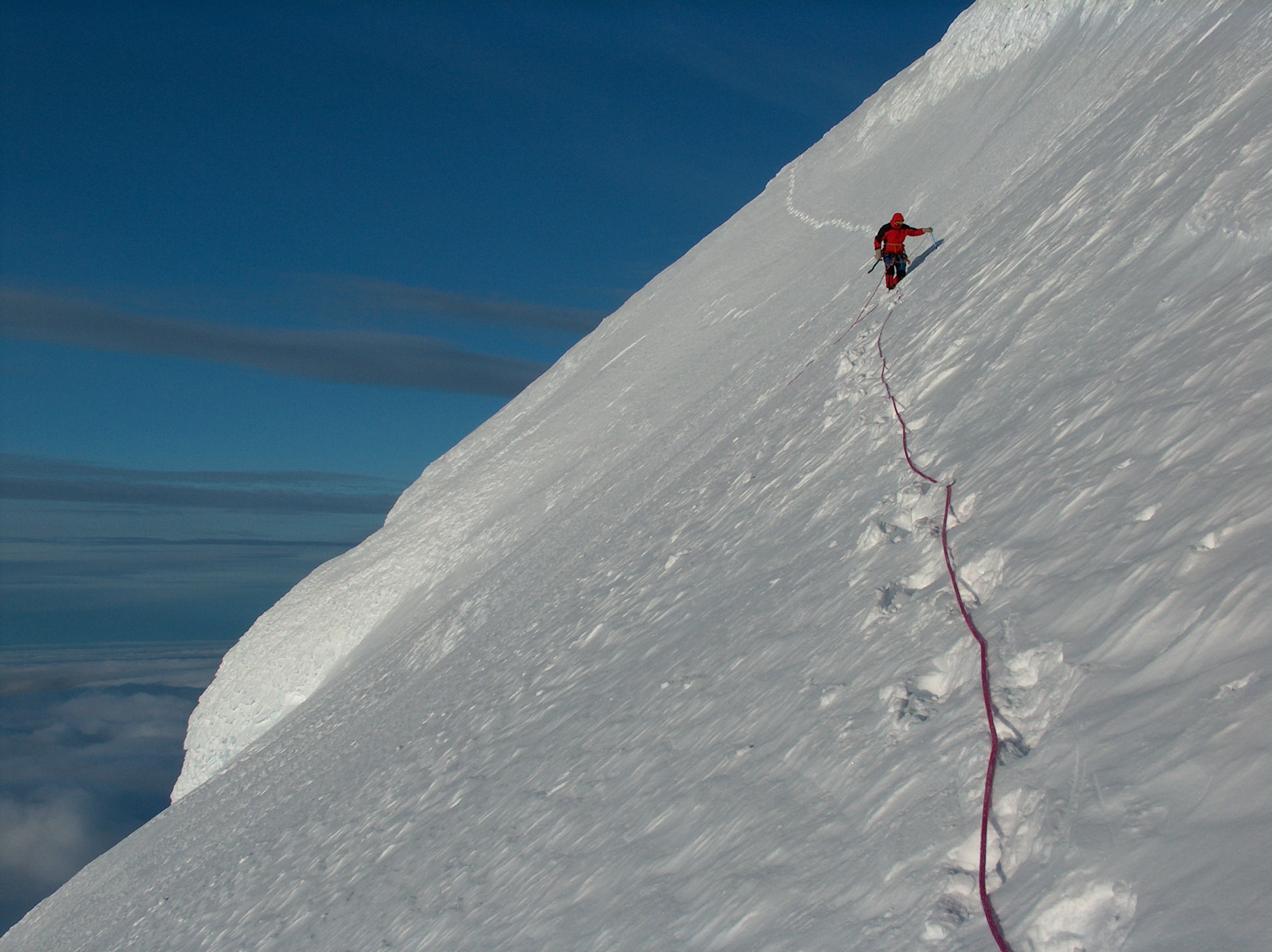
Survey mission. Traversing the west slopes of Lyaskovets Peak

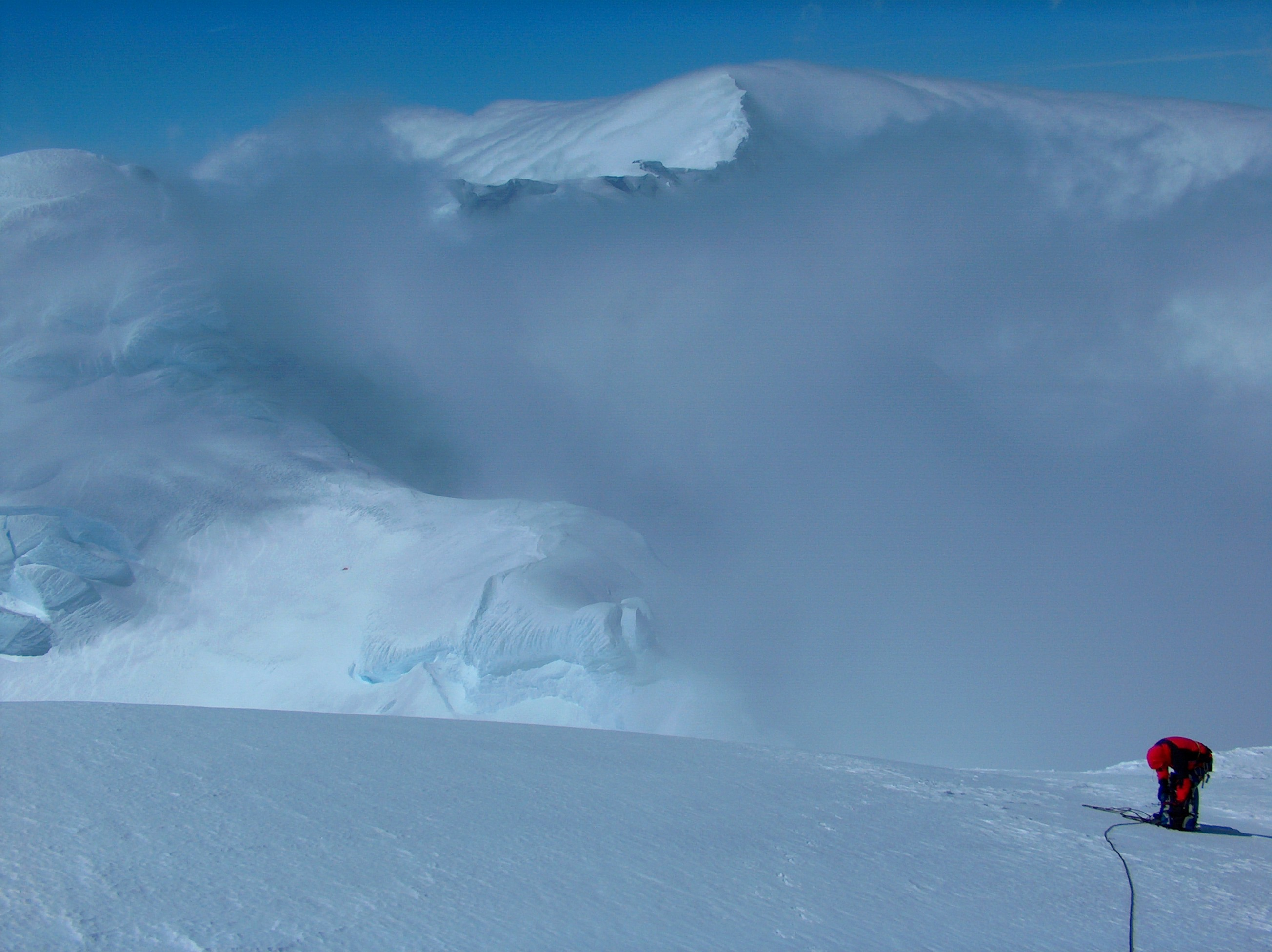
On the crest of Tangra Mountains. Catalunyan Saddle from Presian Ridge, with St. Ivan Rilski Col and Great Needle Peak in the background

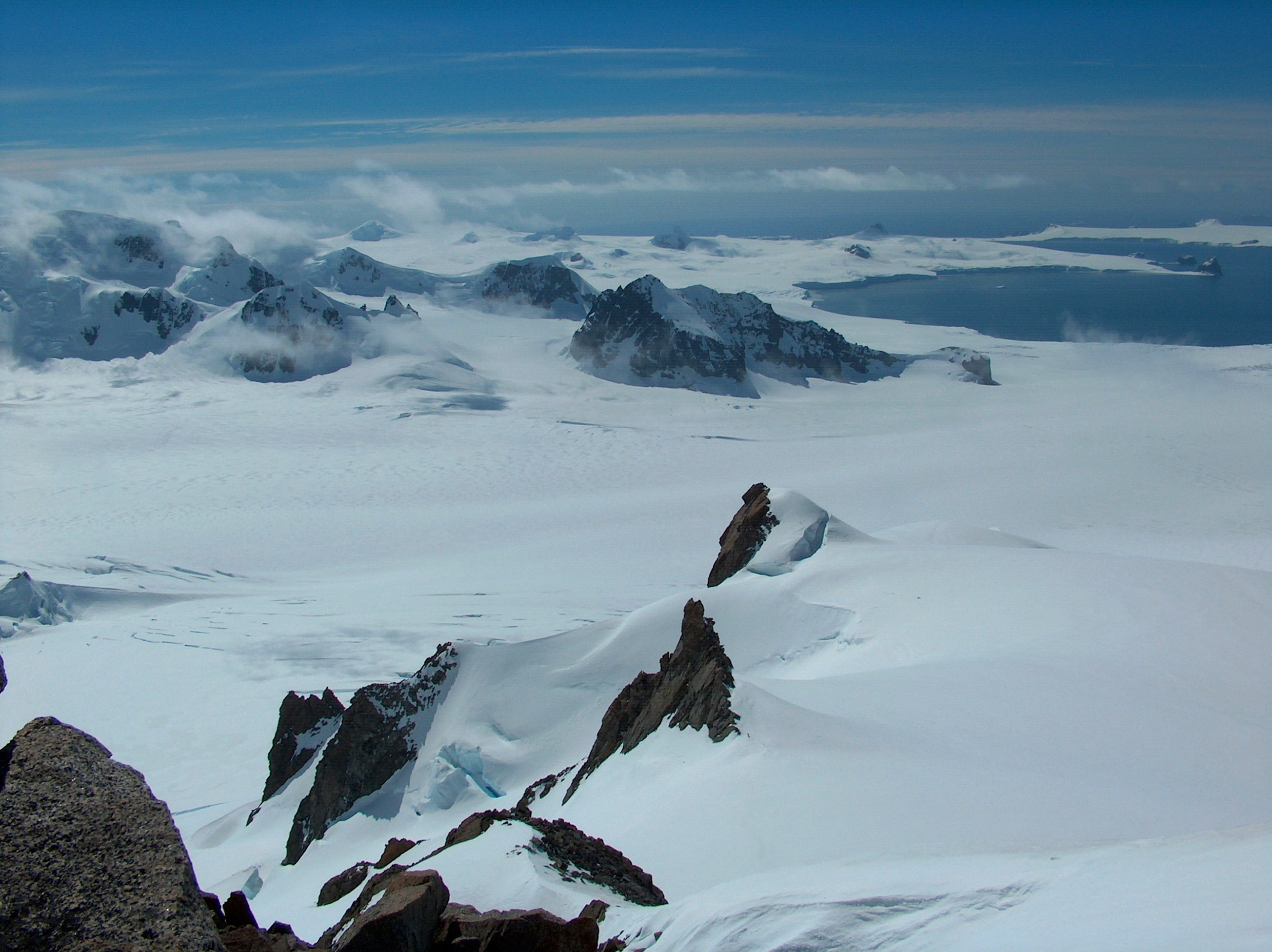
Fieldwork in Levski Ridge. Lower Huron Glacier from Ongal Peak, with eastern Bowles Ridge, Varna Peninsula and Drake Passage in the background

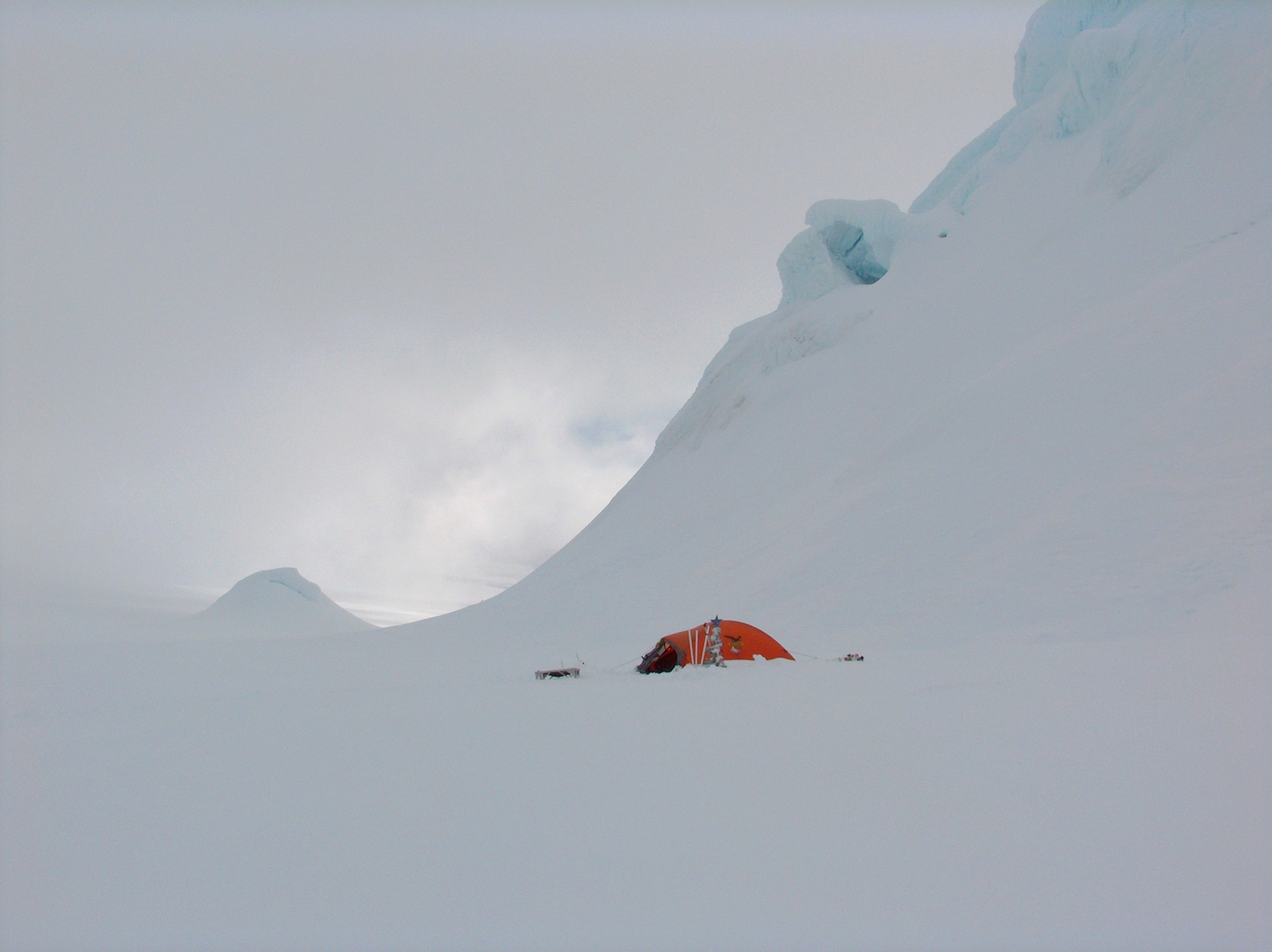
Leslie Hill bivouac from Elhovo Gap. The hill is on the right, with Saedinenie Snowfield to the left and Leslie Gap in the background.

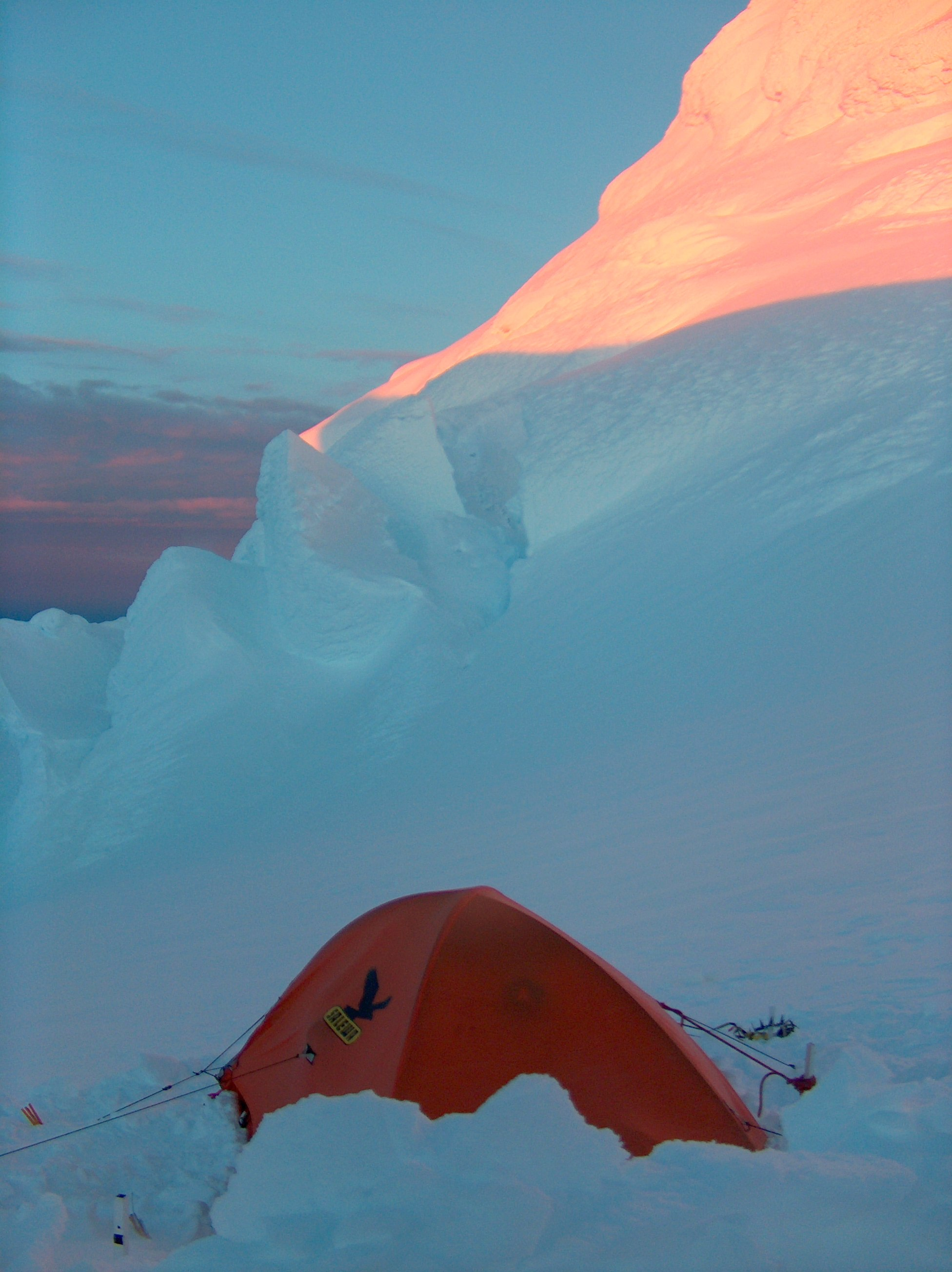
The Tangra 2004/05 bivouac at Catalunyan Saddle

Topographic map of Livingston Island with the bases and base camps on the island

The Tangra 2004/05 Expedition was commissioned by the Antarctic Place-names Commission at the Ministry of Foreign Affairs of Bulgaria, managed by the Manfred Wörner Foundation, and supported by the Bulgarian Antarctic Institute, the Institute of Mathematics and Informatics at the Bulgarian Academy of Sciences, Bulgarian Posts, Uruguayan Antarctic Institute, Peregrine Shipping (Australia), and Petrol Ltd, TNT, Mtel, Bulstrad, Polytours, B. Bekyarov and B. Chernev (Bulgaria).

== Expedition team ==
Dr. Lyubomir Ivanov (team leader), senior research associate, Institute of Mathematics and Informatics at the Bulgarian Academy of Sciences; chairman, Antarctic Place-names Commission; author of the 1995 Bulgarian Antarctic Toponymic Guidelines introducing in particular the present official system for the Romanization of Bulgarian; participant in four Bulgarian Antarctic campaigns, and author of the first Bulgarian Antarctic topographic maps.

Doychin Vasilev, Bulgarian alpinist who has climbed five Himalayan 8,000 m peaks: Dhaulagiri (in 1995), Mount Everest (1997), Makalu (1998), and Shishapangma and Cho Oyu (1999).

== Logistics and itinerary ==
Expedition vessels: Uruguayan Navy ship ROU Vanguardia, and Russian research ship Akademik Sergey Vavilov.

Land transportation: man sledding, skiing, and trekking.

Duration: 14 November 2004 to 29 January 2005.

Antarctica: 25 November 2004 to 11 January 2005;
Livingston Island: 28 November 2004 to 4 January 2005;
St. Kliment Ohridski Base: 28 November to 8 December 2004, and 2–4 January 2005;
Camp Academia (541 m): 3 December 2004 to 2 January 2005;
Catalunyan Saddle bivouac (1255 m): 14–16 December 2004;
Juan Carlos I Base: 18 December 2004;
Elhovo Gap/Leslie Hill bivouac (421 m): 24–28 December 2004;
Hannah Point: 4 January 2005;
Half Moon Island: 8 January 2005.

== Field work ==
The Tangra 2004/05 team covered either on ski or on foot an overall distance of some 200 km, mostly in harsh weather conditions and challenging, unfamiliar terrain in eastern Livingston Island, including the first crossing of Bowles Ridge, and first visit and routes to Vidin Heights, Gleaner Heights, Melnik Ridge, Levski Ridge, Saedinenie Snowfield, Kaliakra Glacier, Struma Glacier, middle Huron Glacier, Leslie Gap, Elhovo Gap, Gurev Gap, Yankov Gap, Pirdop Gate, Lozen Saddle, and the peaks Lyaskovets, Zograf, Lozen Nunatak, Erma Knoll, Aheloy Nunatak, Ravda, Komini, Ongal, Melnik, Castra Martis Hill, Radnevo, Zemen Knoll, and Miziya, as well as the third ascent of Presian Ridge and the island's summit Mount Friesland (1700 m). In particular, the survey team traversed the main crest of Tangra Mountains between Mount Friesland and Lyaskovets Peak.

Extensive geodetic and geographic information was gathered, including coordinates and elevation data, actual sea shoreline and ice-free zones configuration, as well as a detailed photographic documentation of previously unexplored and remote areas in the interior of Livingston Island and Greenwich Island.

== Legacy ==
Based on the survey, 146 geographical features were mapped for the first time, and the coordinates of other 8 features were updated. A new 1:100000 scale topographic map of the islands of Livingston and Greenwich was published in August 2005 in 1802 hard copies, and also made available in electronic version both in the website of the Ministry of Foreign Affairs of Bulgaria seen here, and in the Wikimedia Commons. Data from the Tangra 2004/05 expedition was extensively used also in the 2009 Bulgarian map of Livingston, Greenwich, Robert, Snow, and Smith Islands.

In connection with the work carried out by the Tangra 2004/05 Expedition, 126 new Bulgarian names for hitherto nameless geographical features on Livingston Island and Greenwich Island were approved on 11 April and on 4 November 2005.

Invited lectures on the results of the expedition were given at the Faculty of Geology and Geography at Sofia University, the Ministry of Foreign Affairs of Bulgaria, the State Commission on Information Security, the Municipality of Radnevo, etc.

Field work carried out during the survey was noted in 2012 by Discovery Channel, the Natural History Museum, the Royal Collection and the British Antarctic Survey as a timeline event in Antarctic exploration.

== See also ==
- Antarctic Place-names Commission
- Camp Academia
- Tangra Mountains
- Livingston Island
- Half Moon Island
- Greenwich Island
- List of Bulgarian toponyms in Antarctica

== Maps ==
- S. Soccol, D. Gildea and J. Bath. Livingston Island, Antarctica. Scale 1:100000 satellite map. The Omega Foundation, USA, 2004
- Tangra 2004/05 Expegition route
- L. Ivanov, N. Glavinchev, R. Tosheva and S. Naydenov. Antarctica: Livingston Island and Greenwich Island, South Shetland Islands (from English Strait to Morton Strait, with illustrations and ice-cover distribution). Scale 1:100000 topographic map. Antarctic Place-names Commission of Bulgaria. Sofia, 2005
- L.L. Ivanov. Antarctica: Livingston Island and Greenwich, Robert, Snow and Smith Islands. Scale 1:120000 topographic map. Troyan: Manfred Wörner Foundation, 2010. ISBN 978-954-92032-9-5
- L.L. Ivanov. Antarctica: Livingston Island and Smith Island. Scale 1:100000 topographic map. Manfred Wörner Foundation, 2017. ISBN 978-619-90008-3-0
- Antarctic Digital Database (ADD). Scale 1:250000 topographic map of Antarctica. Scientific Committee on Antarctic Research (SCAR). Since 1993, regularly upgraded and updated

== Sources ==
- L.L. Ivanov. Bulgarian Topographic Survey Tangra 2004/05: XIII National Antarctic Expedition. Public lecture held at Sofia University, Ministry of Foreign Affairs and elsewhere. March–April 2005
- Antarctica: Livingston Island, Climb Magazine, Issue 14, Kettering, UK, April 2006, pp. 89-91
- L.L. Ivanov, Livingston Island: Tangra Mountains, Komini Peak, west slope new rock route; Lyaskovets Peak, first ascent; Zograf Peak, first ascent; Vidin Heights, Melnik Peak, Melnik Ridge, first ascent, The American Alpine Journal, 2005, 312-315.
- L.L. Ivanov. Bulgaria in Antarctica. South Shetland Islands. Livingston Island and Greenwich, Robert, Snow and Smith Islands. Sofia: Manfred Wörner Foundation, 2009. 16 pp. ISBN 978-954-92032-7-1
- J. Stewart. Antarctica: An Encyclopedia. Jefferson, N.C. and London: McFarland, 2011. 1771 pp. ISBN 978-0-7864-3590-6
- L. Ivanov and N. Ivanova. The World of Antarctica. Generis Publishing, 2022. 241 pp. ISBN 979-8-88676-403-1 (2014 Bulgarian edition of the book)
