= Miziya Peak =

Peak in Antarctica

Location of Varna Peninsula on Livingston Island in the South Shetland Islands

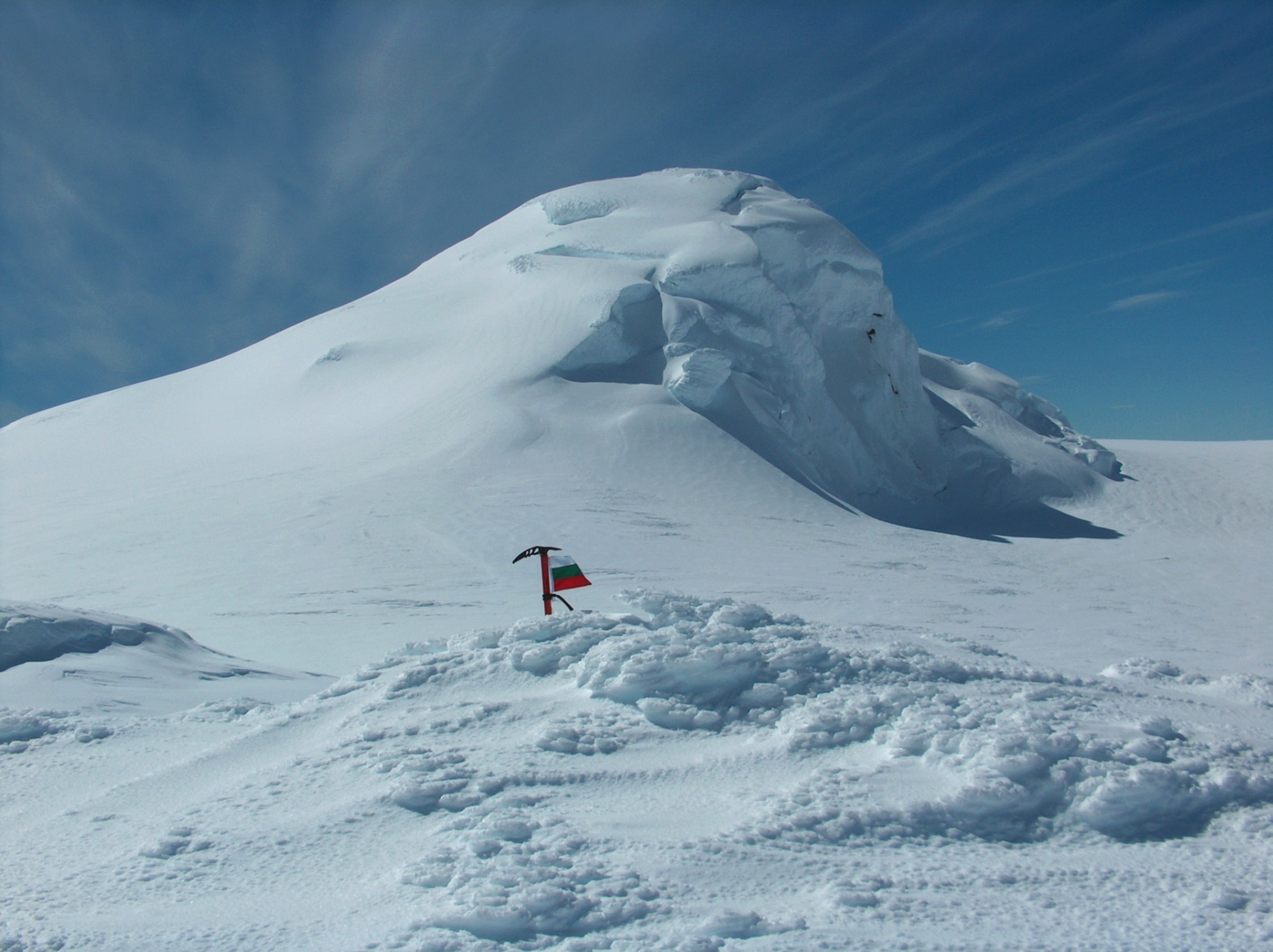
Miziya Peak from Zemen Knoll

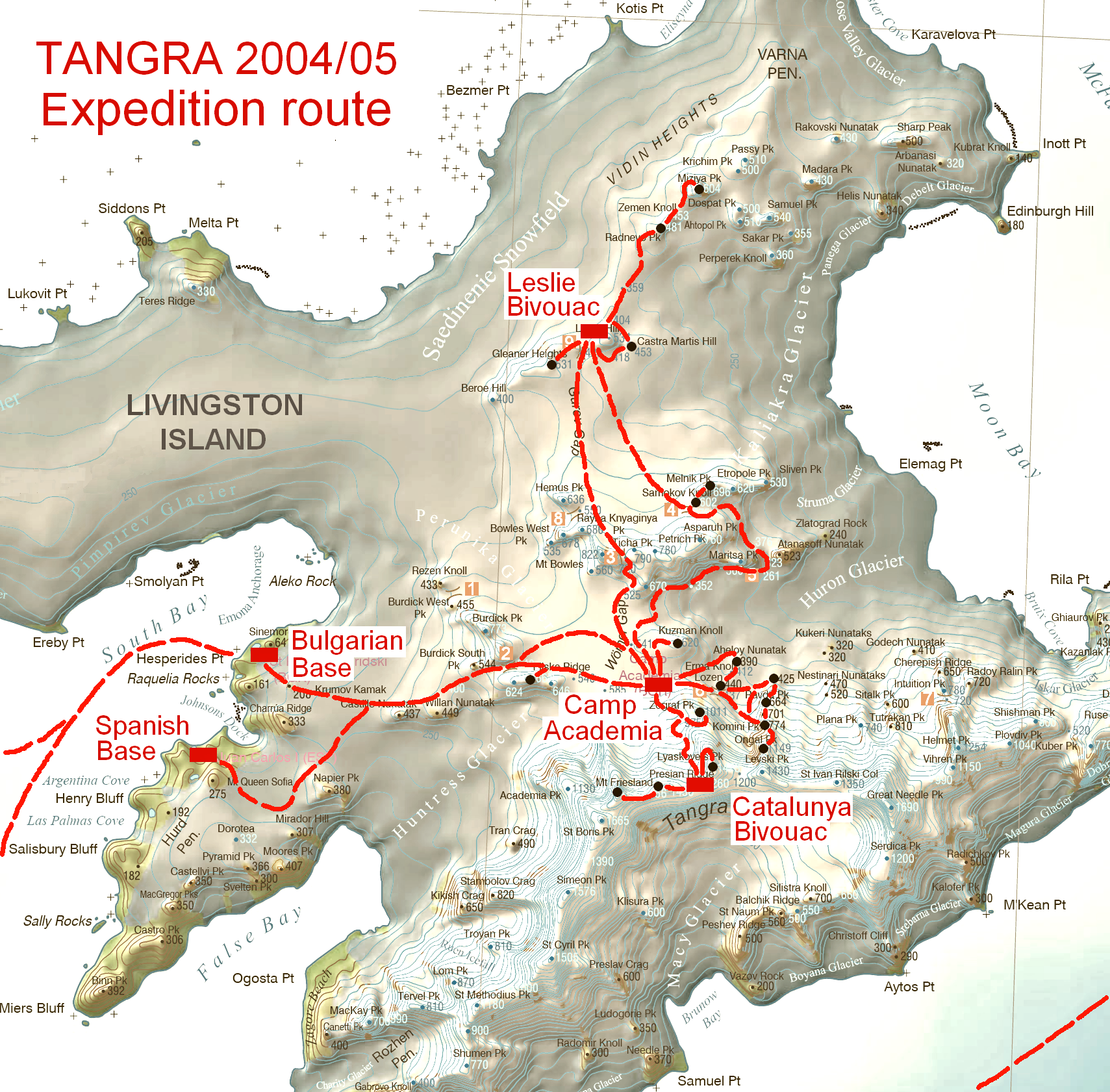
The survey route of Tangra 2004/05 including Miziya Peak

Topographic map of Livingston Island and Smith Island

Miziya Peak (Bulgarian: връх Мизия, romanized: vrah Miziya, IPA: [ˈvrɤx ˈmizijɐ]) is the 604 m summit of Vidin Heights on Varna Peninsula, eastern Livingston Island in the South Shetland Islands, Antarctica. The peak overlooks Kaliakra Glacier to the south, and Saedinenie Snowfield to the northwest. First ascent by Lyubomir Ivanov from Camp Academia on 25 December 2004, as part of Tangra 2004/05 survey.

The peak is named after the Bulgarian town of Miziya in relation to the ancient Thracian province of Miziya (Moesia).

== Location ==
The peak is located at 62°32′08″S 60°09′52.7″W, which is 7.4 km north of Melnik Peak, 9.25 km north by east of Mount Bowles, 4.24 km north-northeast of Leslie Hill, 4.19 km north-northeast of Castra Martis Hill, 5.4 km northeast of the summit of Gleaner Heights, 4.55 km south-southeast of Kotis Point, 9.47 km south of Williams Point and 7.52 km west of Edinburgh Hill (Bulgarian topographic survey Tangra 2004/05, and mapping in 2005 and 2009).

== Maps ==
- L.L. Ivanov et al. Antarctica: Livingston Island and Greenwich Island, South Shetland Islands. Scale 1:100000 topographic map. Sofia: Antarctic Place-names Commission of Bulgaria, 2005.
- L.L. Ivanov. Antarctica: Livingston Island and Greenwich, Robert, Snow and Smith Islands. Scale 1:120000 topographic map. Troyan: Manfred Wörner Foundation, 2009. ISBN 978-954-92032-6-4
- L.L. Ivanov. Antarctica: Livingston Island and Smith Island. Scale 1:100000 topographic map. Manfred Wörner Foundation, 2017. ISBN 978-619-90008-3-0
- A. Kamburov and L. Ivanov. Bowles Ridge and Central Tangra Mountains: Livingston Island, Antarctica. Scale 1:25000 map. Sofia: Manfred Wörner Foundation, 2023. ISBN 978-619-90008-6-1
