= Leslie Hill (Livingston Island) =

Mountain in Antarctica

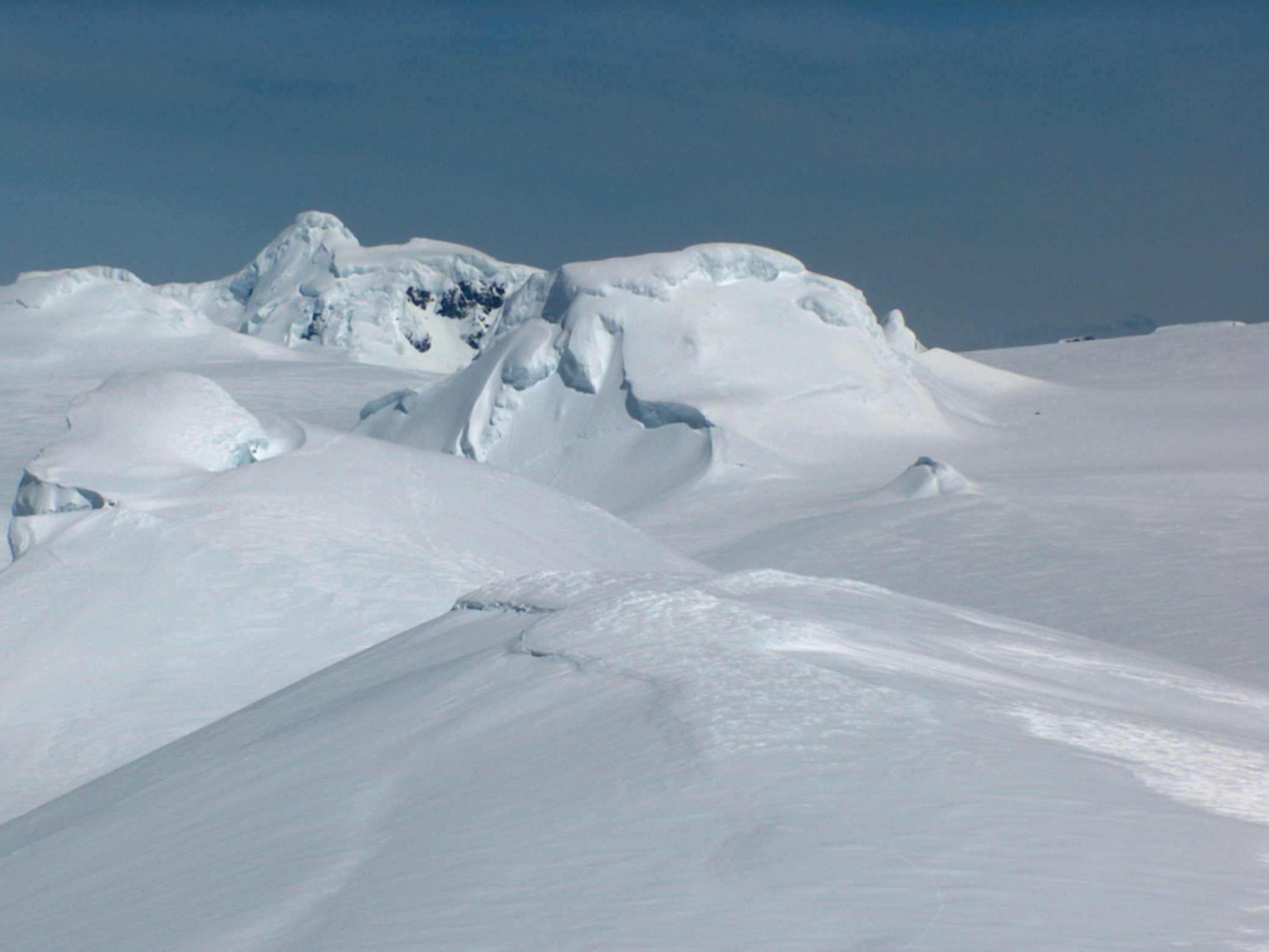
- Leslie Hill from Miziya Peak, with Radnevo Peak and Zemen Knoll in the foreground and Burdick Ridge in the background.

Naming
- Etymology: David Leslie, master of the whaler Gleaner

Geography
- Location within Antarctica
- Continent: Antarctica
- Island: Livingston Island, South Shetland Islands
- Range coordinates: 62°34′S 60°12′W

Leslie Hill (62°34′S 60°12′W) is a hill lying northward of Bowles Ridge and south of the Vidin Heights in the eastern part of Livingston Island in the South Shetland Islands, Antarctica. Situated 5.33 km (3.31 mi) north of Mount Bowles, 1.43 km (0.89 mi) east-northeast of the summit of Gleaner Heights and 3.15 km (1.96 mi) south-southwest of Radnevo Peak.

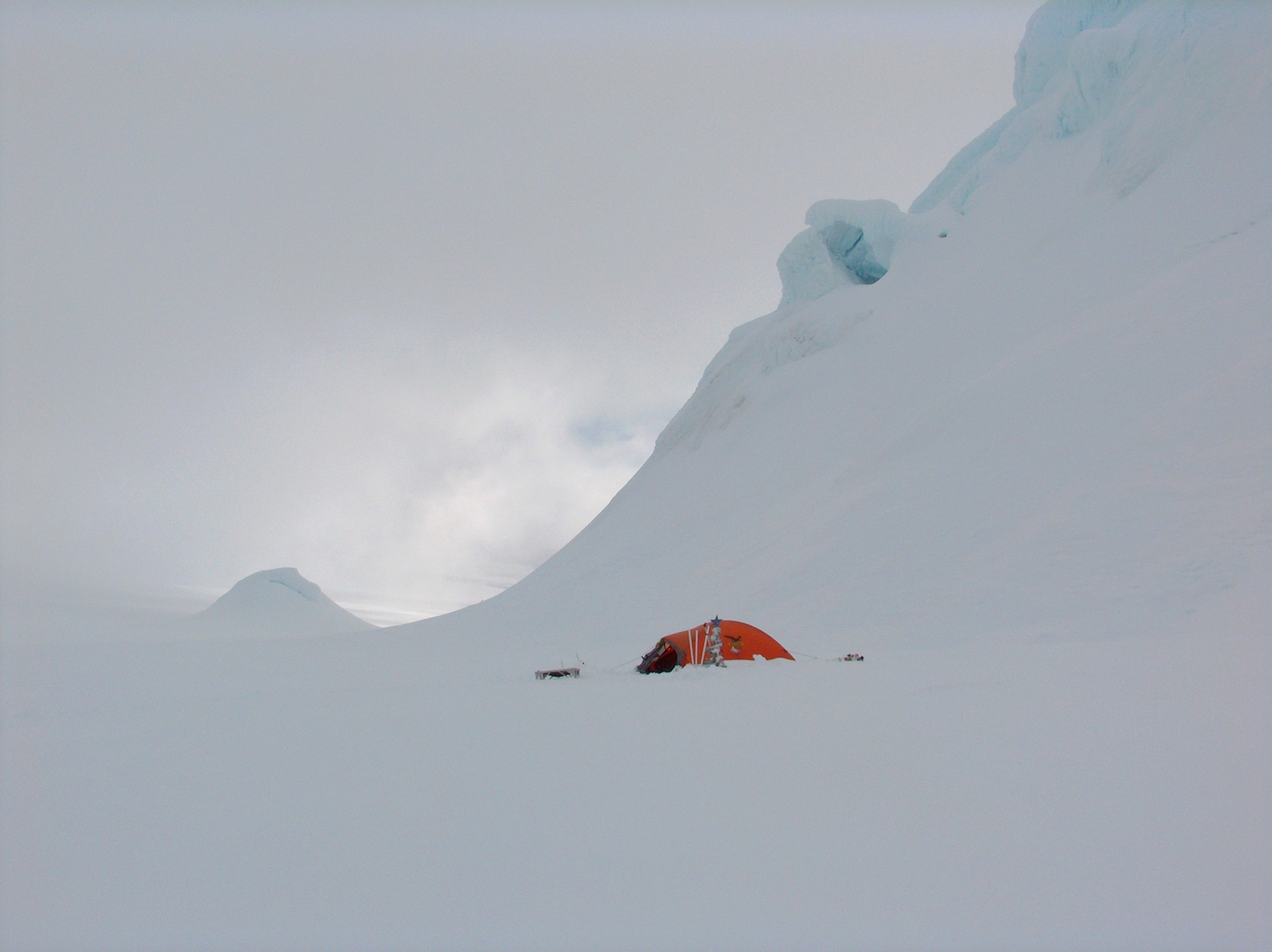
Christmas tree by Leslie Hill.

Location of Livingston Island in the South Shetland Islands.

The hill was named by the UK Antarctic Place-Names Committee in 1958 for David Leslie, Master of the American brig Gleaner, a whaler from New Bedford, Massachusetts, which was diverted to sealing in 1820–21 in the South Shetland Islands, following the discovery of this group.

== See also ==
- Tangra 2004/05

== Maps ==
- L.L. Ivanov et al. Antarctica: Livingston Island and Greenwich Island, South Shetland Islands. Scale 1:100000 topographic map. Sofia: Antarctic Place-names Commission of Bulgaria, 2005.
- L.L. Ivanov. Antarctica: Livingston Island and Greenwich, Robert, Snow and Smith Islands. Scale 1:120000 topographic map. Troyan: Manfred Wörner Foundation, 2009.
- L.L. Ivanov. Antarctica: Livingston Island and Smith Island. Scale 1:100000 topographic map. Manfred Wörner Foundation, 2017. ISBN 978-619-90008-3-0
- A. Kamburov and L. Ivanov. Bowles Ridge and Central Tangra Mountains: Livingston Island, Antarctica. Scale 1:25000 map. Sofia: Manfred Wörner Foundation, 2023. ISBN 978-619-90008-6-1
