= Sakar Peak =

Peak of elevation in the South Shetland Islands, Antarctica

Location of Varna Peninsula on Livingston Island in the South Shetland Islands.

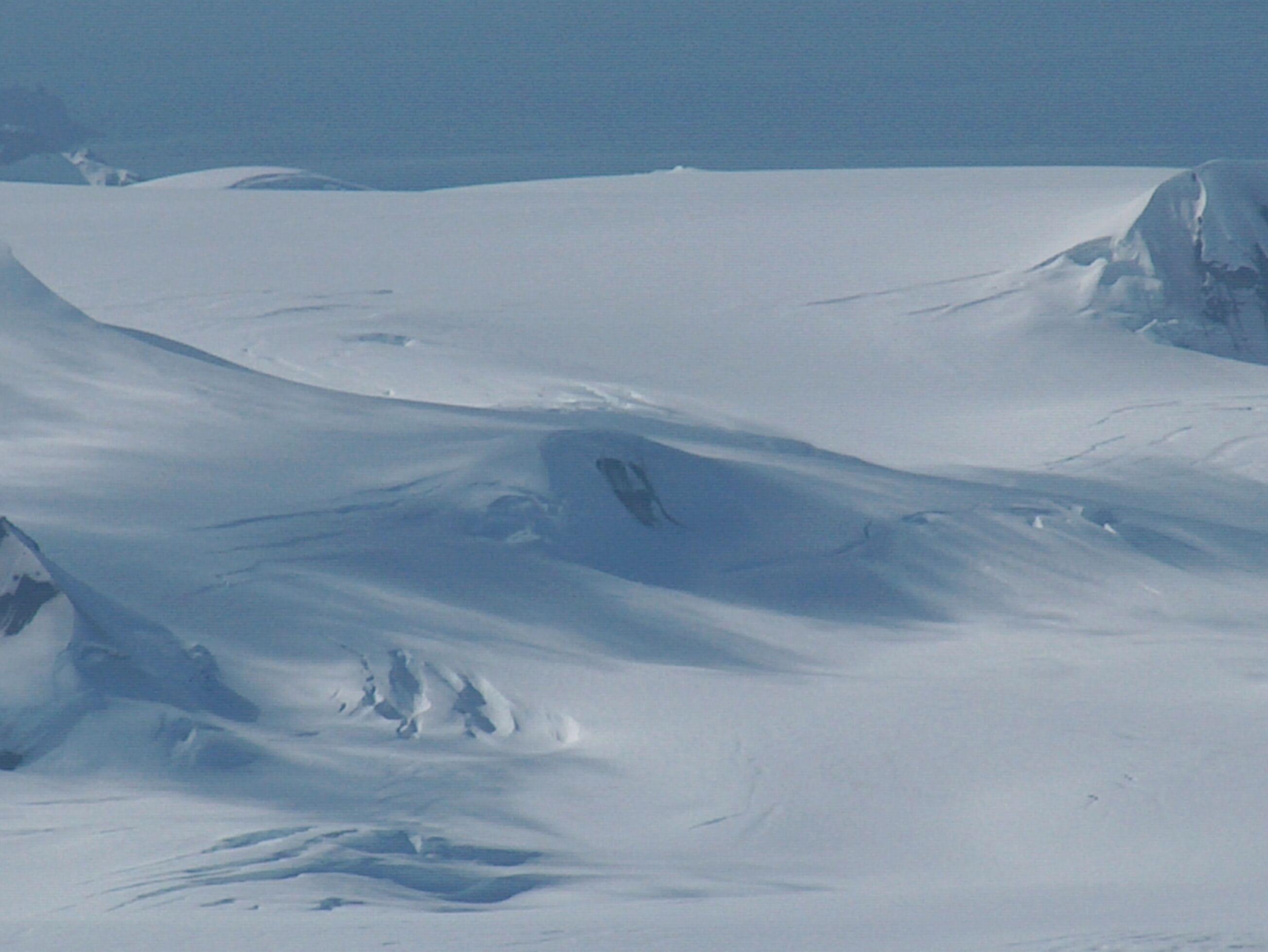
Sakar Peak from Komini Peak.

Topographic map of Livingston Island, Greenwich, Robert, Snow and Smith Islands.

Sakar Peak (Bulgarian: връх Сакар, romanized: vrah Sakar, IPA: [ˈvrɤx sɐˈkar]) is a peak of elevation 355 m in Vidin Heights on Varna Peninsula, Livingston Island in the South Shetland Islands, Antarctica. Partly ice-free southeast slopes. Surmounting Panega Glacier to the north and east, and the lower course of Kaliakra Glacier to the south.

The peak is named after Sakar Mountain in southeastern Bulgaria.

== Location ==
The peak is located at 62°32′43″S 60°07′15″W, which is 570 m northeast of Perperek Knoll, 590 m southeast of Samuel Peak, 1.29 km south-southeast of Madara Peak and 2.28 km west-southwest of Helis Nunatak (Bulgarian topographic survey Tangra 2004/05, and mapping in 2005 and 2009).

== Maps ==
- L.L. Ivanov et al. Antarctica: Livingston Island and Greenwich Island, South Shetland Islands. Scale 1:100000 topographic map. Sofia: Antarctic Place-names Commission of Bulgaria, 2005.
- L.L. Ivanov. Antarctica: Livingston Island and Greenwich, Robert, Snow and Smith Islands. Scale 1:120000 topographic map. Troyan: Manfred Wörner Foundation, 2009. ISBN 978-954-92032-6-4
- A. Kamburov and L. Ivanov. Bowles Ridge and Central Tangra Mountains: Livingston Island, Antarctica. Scale 1:25000 map. Sofia: Manfred Wörner Foundation, 2023. ISBN 978-619-90008-6-1
