= Passy Peak =

Peak on Livingston Island, Antarctica

Location of Varna Peninsula on Livingston Island in the South Shetland Islands.

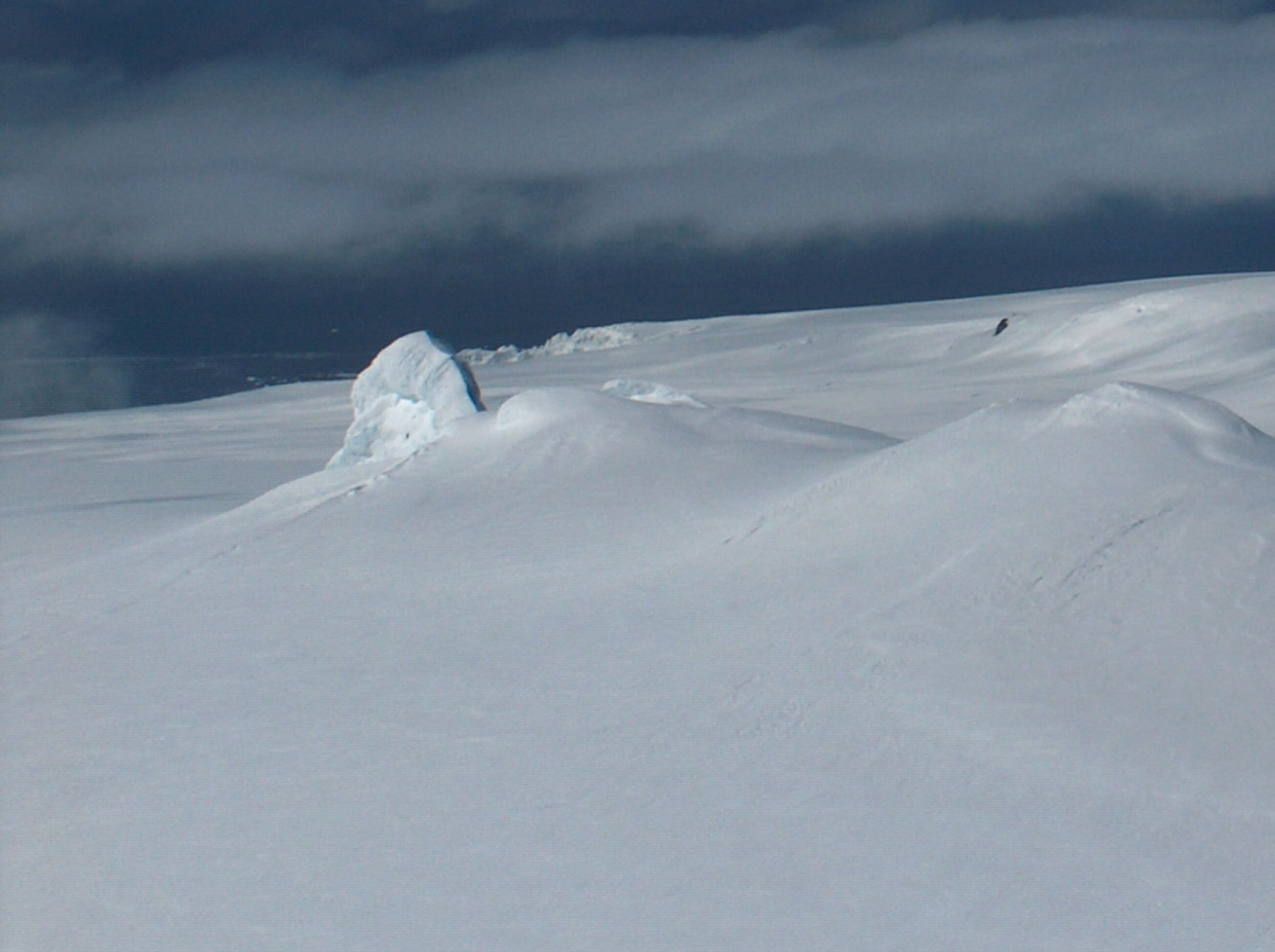
Passy Peak from Miziya Peak.

Topographic map of Livingston Island, Greenwich, Robert, Snow and Smith Islands.

Passy Peak (Bulgarian: връх Паси, romanized: vrah Pasi, IPA: [ˈvrɤx pɐˈsi]) is a peak of elevation 510 m in Vidin Heights on Varna Peninsula, Livingston Island in the South Shetland Islands, Antarctica. Surmounting Panega Glacier to the southeast, Rose Valley Glacier to the northeast, and Saedinenie Snowfield to the northwest. The peak is named after Solomon Passy (b. 1956) in appreciation of his role in organizing the Bulgarian Antarctic campaigns and the upgrade of St. Kliment Ohridski base in 1993–96.

== Location ==
The peak is located at 62°31′43″S 60°08′27″W, which is 1.4 km northeast of Miziya Peak, 8.6 km south of Williams Point, 1.6 km west-northwest of Madara Peak and 380 m northeast of Krichim Peak (Bulgarian topographic survey Tangra 2004/05, and mapping in 2005 and 2009).

== Maps ==
- L.L. Ivanov et al. Antarctica: Livingston Island and Greenwich Island, South Shetland Islands. Scale 1:100000 topographic map. Sofia: Antarctic Place-names Commission of Bulgaria, 2005.
- L.L. Ivanov. Antarctica: Livingston Island and Greenwich, Robert, Snow and Smith Islands. Scale 1:120000 topographic map. Troyan: Manfred Wörner Foundation, 2009. ISBN 978-954-92032-6-4
