= Rakovski Nunatak =

Location of Varna Peninsula on Livingston Island in the South Shetland Islands.

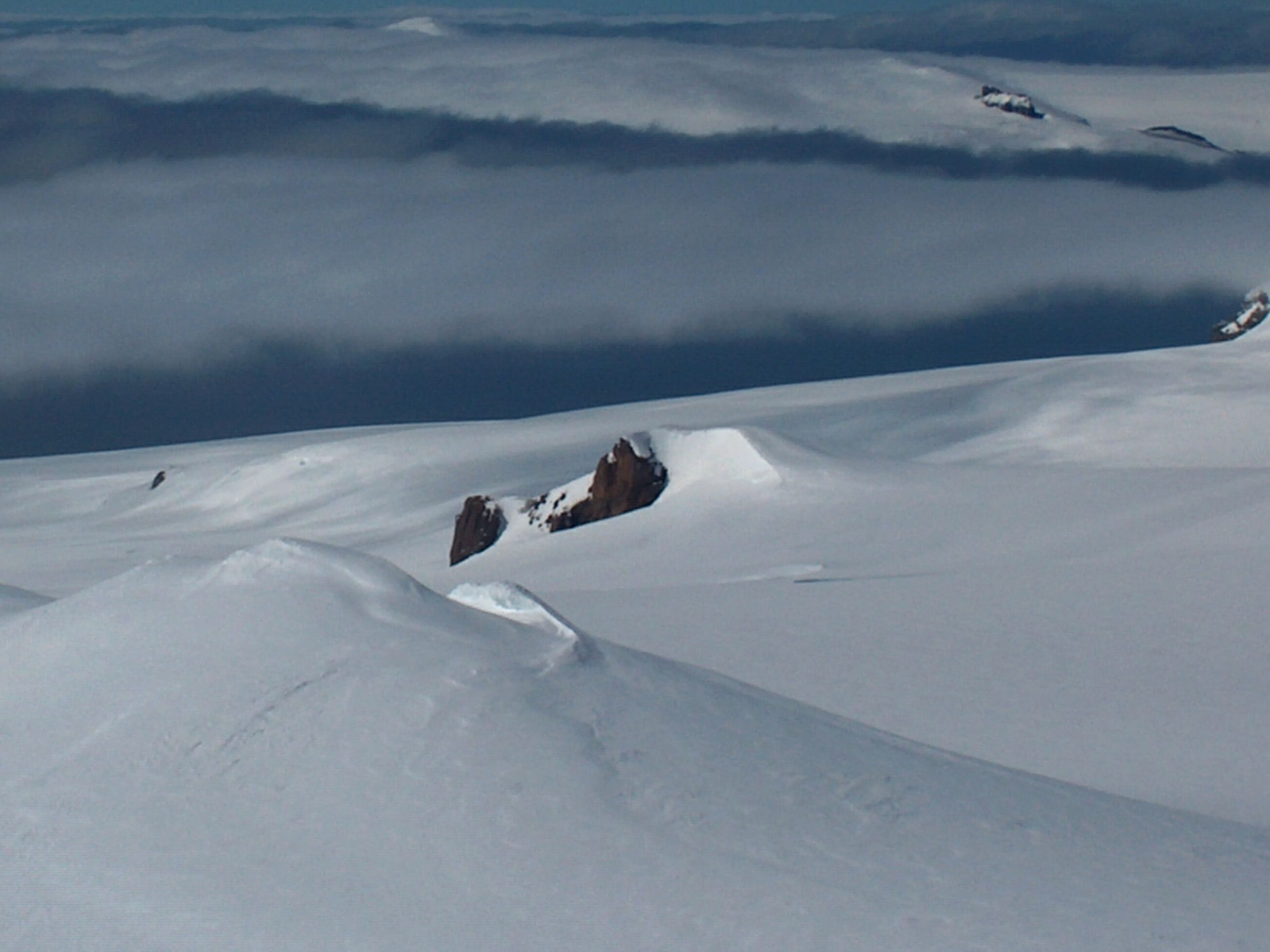
Rakovski Nunatak from Miziya Peak.

Topographic map of Livingston Island, Greenwich, Robert, Snow and Smith Islands.

Rakovski Nunatak (Rakovski Nunatak \ra-'kov-ski 'nu-na-tak\) is a rocky peak of elevation 430 m in Vidin Heights on Varna Peninsula, Livingston Island in the South Shetland Islands, Antarctica. Surmounting Rose Valley Glacier to the north.

The peak is named after Georgi S. Rakovski (1821–1867), writer and leader of the Bulgarian liberation movement.

== Location ==
The peak is located at 62°31′24″S 60°06′00″W, which is 1.58 km west of Sharp Peak, 3.6 km northeast of Miziya Peak and 1.38 km north-northeast of Madara Peak (Bulgarian topographic survey Tangra 2004/05, and mapping in 2005 and 2009).

== Maps ==
- L.L. Ivanov et al. Antarctica: Livingston Island and Greenwich Island, South Shetland Islands. Scale 1:100000 topographic map. Sofia: Antarctic Place-names Commission of Bulgaria, 2005.
- L.L. Ivanov. Antarctica: Livingston Island and Greenwich, Robert, Snow and Smith Islands. Scale 1:120000 topographic map. Troyan: Manfred Wörner Foundation, 2009. ISBN 978-954-92032-6-4
