= Krichim Peak =

Mountain in Livingston Island, South Shetland Islands, Antarctica

Location of Varna Peninsula on Livingston Island in the South Shetland Islands.

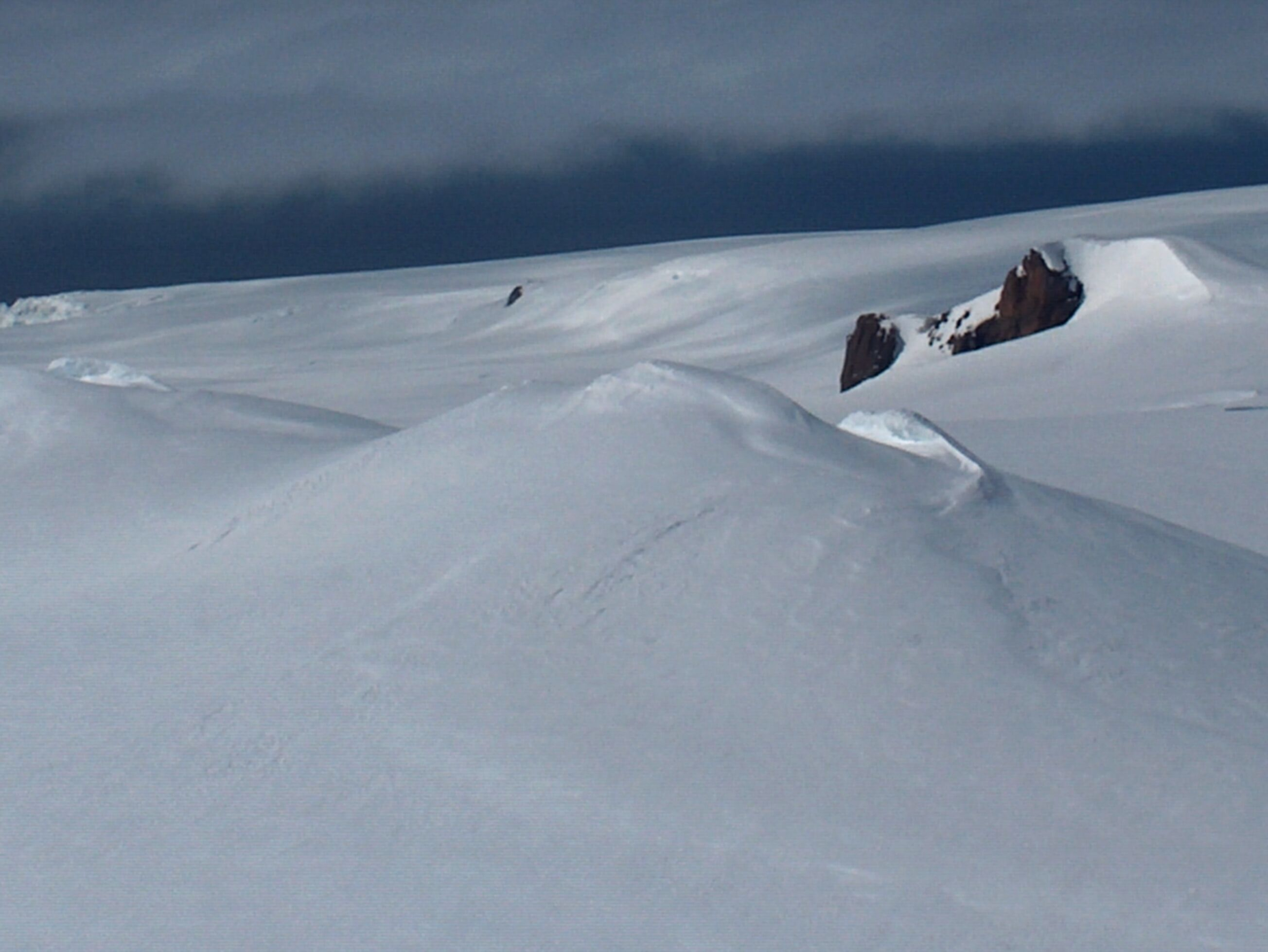
Krichim Peak from Miziya Peak.

Topographic map of Livingston Island, Greenwich, Robert, Snow and Smith Islands.

Krichim Peak (Bulgarian: връх Кричим, romanized: vrah Krichim, IPA: [ˈvrɤx ˈkrit͡ʃim]) is an ice-covered peak of elevation 500 m in Vidin Heights on Varna Peninsula, Livingston Island, an island in the South Shetland Islands, Antarctica. Surmounting Saedinenie Snowfield to the northwest and Panega Glacier to the southeast. The peak is named after the town of Krichim in Southern Bulgaria.

== Location ==
The cliff is located at 62°31′53″S 60°08′42″W which is 1.11 km northeast of Miziya Peak, 930 m north of Dospat Peak, 380 m southwest of Passy Peak and 1.73 km west-northwest of Madara Peak (Bulgarian mapping in 2005 and 2009 from the Tangra 2004/05 topographic survey).

== Maps ==
- L.L. Ivanov et al. Antarctica: Livingston Island and Greenwich Island, South Shetland Islands. Scale 1:100000 topographic map. Sofia: Antarctic Place-names Commission of Bulgaria, 2005.
- L.L. Ivanov. Antarctica: Livingston Island and Greenwich, Robert, Snow and Smith Islands. Scale 1:120000 topographic map. Troyan: Manfred Wörner Foundation, 2009.
