= Sharp Peak, Livingston Island =

Mountain in Livingston Island, South Shetland Islands, Antarctica

Location of Varna Peninsula on Livingston Island in the South Shetland Islands.

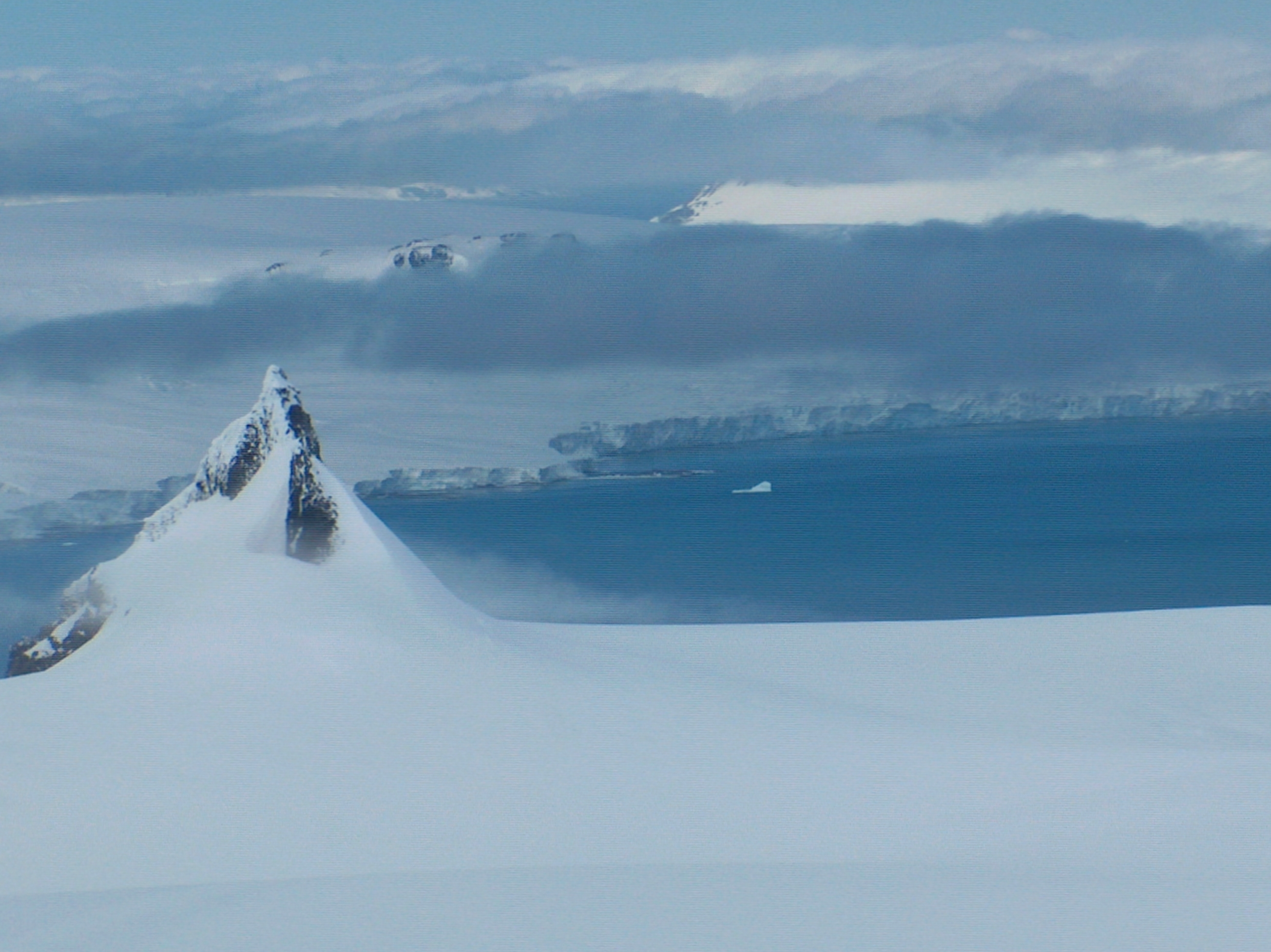
Sharp Peak from Miziya Peak, with McFarlane Strait and Greenwich Island in the background.

Topographic map of Livingston Island and Smith Island.

Sharp Peak is a sharp rocky peak rising to 500 m in the northeast of Vidin Heights on Varna Peninsula, Livingston Island in the South Shetland Islands, Antarctica. The peak is surmounting Rose Valley Glacier to the northwest and Debelt Glacier to the south.

The feature was named descriptively in a 1935 British chart.

== Location ==
The peak is located at 62°31′25.2″S 60°04′09.3″W which is 2.38 km south by west of Karavelova Point, 3.28 km west of Inott Point, 3.28 km northwest of Edinburgh Hill, 1.9 km north by east of Helis Nunatak, 3.73 km northeast of Samuel Peak and 5.08 km east-northeast of Miziya Peak (British survey in 1957-59 and mapping in 1968, Spanish mapping in 1991, and Bulgarian in 2005 and 2009).

== See also ==
- Varna Peninsula
- Livingston Island

== Maps ==
- L.L. Ivanov et al. Antarctica: Livingston Island and Greenwich Island, South Shetland Islands. Scale 1:100000 topographic map. Sofia: Antarctic Place-names Commission of Bulgaria, 2005.
- L.L. Ivanov. Antarctica: Livingston Island and Greenwich, Robert, Snow and Smith Islands. Scale 1:120000 topographic map. Troyan: Manfred Wörner Foundation, 2009. ISBN 978-954-92032-6-4
