= Madara Peak =

Peak in the South Shetland Islands, Antarctica

Location of Varna Peninsula on Livingston Island in the South Shetland Islands.

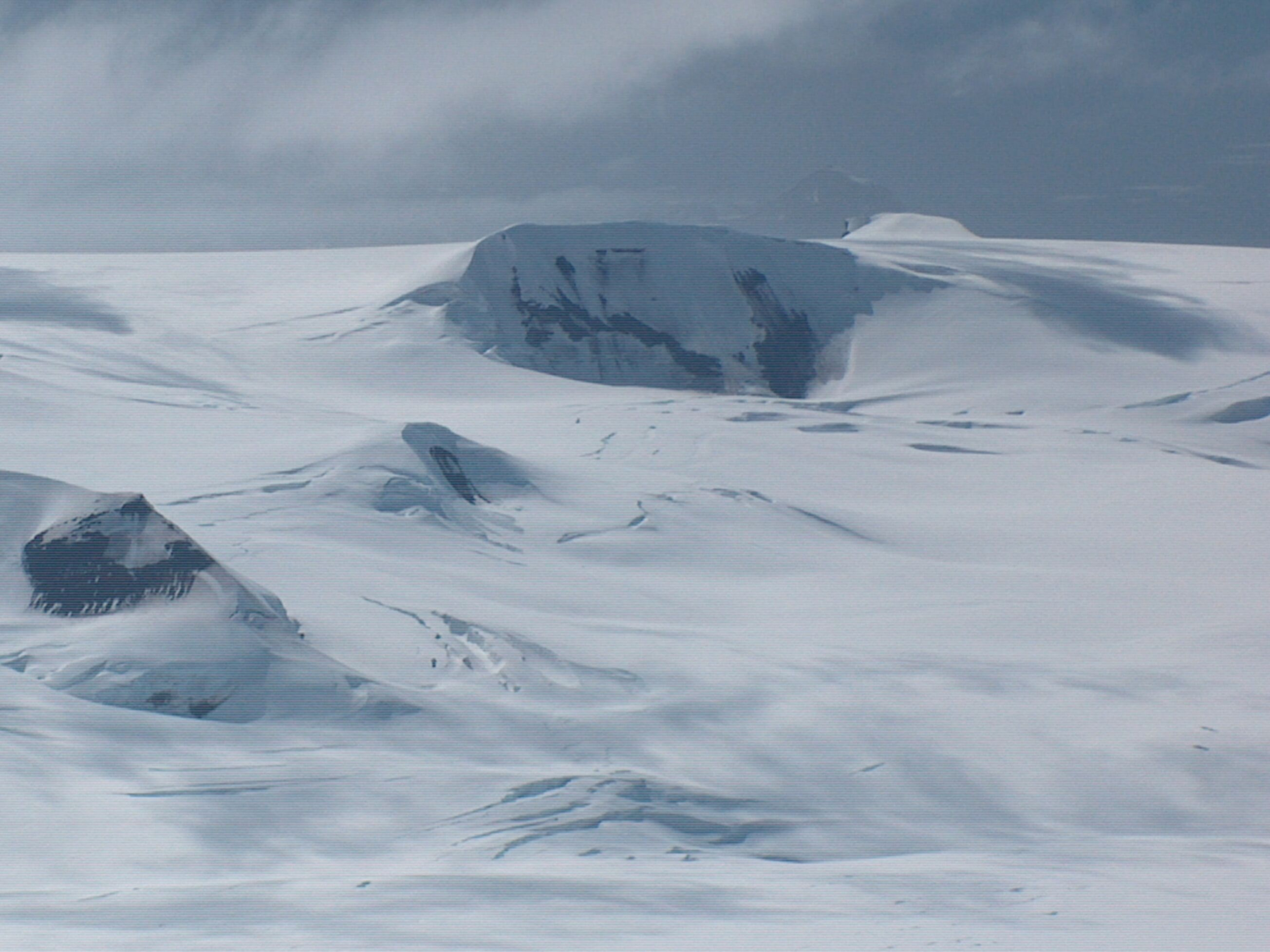
Madara Peak from Melnik Peak.

Topographic map of Livingston Island, Greenwich, Robert, Snow and Smith Islands.

Madara Peak (Bulgarian: връх Мадара, romanized: vrah Madara, IPA: [ˈvrɤx ˈmadɐrɐ]) is a 430 m peak in Vidin Heights on Varna Peninsula, Livingston Island in the South Shetland Islands, Antarctica. Surmounting Panega Glacier to the south. Steep and partly ice-free southern slopes. The peak is named after the historic site of Madara in northeastern Bulgaria.

== Location ==
The peak is located at 62°32′04″S 60°06′43″W, which is 1.26 km northeast of Samuel Peak, 1.25 km north-northwest of Sakar Peak, 1.3 km northeast of Samuel Peak, 2.6 km east of Miziya Peak, 1.4 km south-southwest of Rakovski Nunatak, 2.5 km southwest of Sharp Peak and 4.97 km west by north of Edinburgh Hill (Bulgarian topographic survey Tangra 2004/05, and mapping in 2005 and 2009).

== Maps ==
- L.L. Ivanov et al. Antarctica: Livingston Island and Greenwich Island, South Shetland Islands. Scale 1:100000 topographic map. Sofia: Antarctic Place-names Commission of Bulgaria, 2005.
- L.L. Ivanov. Antarctica: Livingston Island and Greenwich, Robert, Snow and Smith Islands. Scale 1:120000 topographic map. Troyan: Manfred Wörner Foundation, 2009.
- A. Kamburov and L. Ivanov. Bowles Ridge and Central Tangra Mountains: Livingston Island, Antarctica. Scale 1:25000 map. Sofia: Manfred Wörner Foundation, 2023. ISBN 978-619-90008-6-1
