= Arbanasi Nunatak =

High rocky peak in Vidin Heights on Varna Peninsula, Antarctica

Location of Varna Peninsula on Livingston Island in the South Shetland Islands.

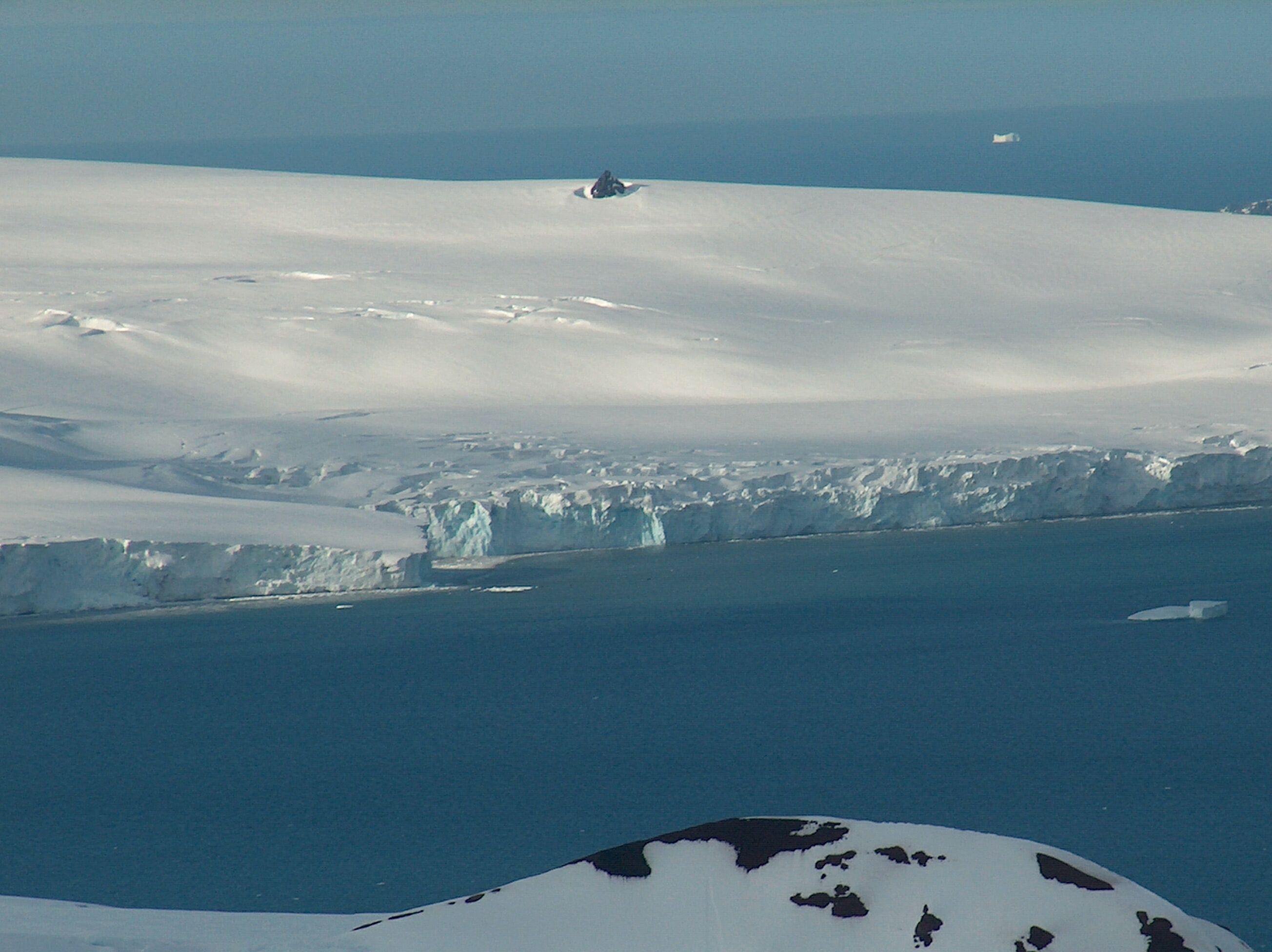
Arbanasi Nunatak from Half Moon Island.

Topographic map of Livingston Island and Smith Island

Arbanasi Nunatak (Nunatak Arbanasi \'nu-na-tak ar-ba-'na-si\) is a 320-metre-high (1,050 ft) rocky peak in Vidin Heights on Varna Peninsula, Livingston Island in Antarctica. The peak was named after the settlement and monastery of Arbanasi near the old Bulgarian capital of Veliko Tarnovo.

== Location ==
The peak is located at 62°31′40″S 60°03′19.6″W which is 860 metres (2,820 ft) east by southeast of Sharp Peak, 2 kilometres (1.2 mi) west of Kubrat Knoll and 2.56 kilometres (1.59 mi) northwest of Edinburgh Hill.

== See also ==
- Tangra 2004/05
- Livingston Island
- List of Bulgarian toponyms in Antarctica
- Antarctic Place-names Commission

== Maps ==
- L.L. Ivanov et al. Antarctica: Livingston Island and Greenwich Island, South Shetland Islands. Scale 1:100000 topographic map. Sofia: Antarctic Place-names Commission of Bulgaria, 2005.
- L.L. Ivanov. Antarctica: Livingston Island and Greenwich, Robert, Snow and Smith Islands. Scale 1:120000 topographic map. Troyan: Manfred Wörner Foundation, 2009.
