= Kubrat Knoll =

Rocky Antarctic peak

Location of Varna Peninsula on Livingston Island in the South Shetland Islands.

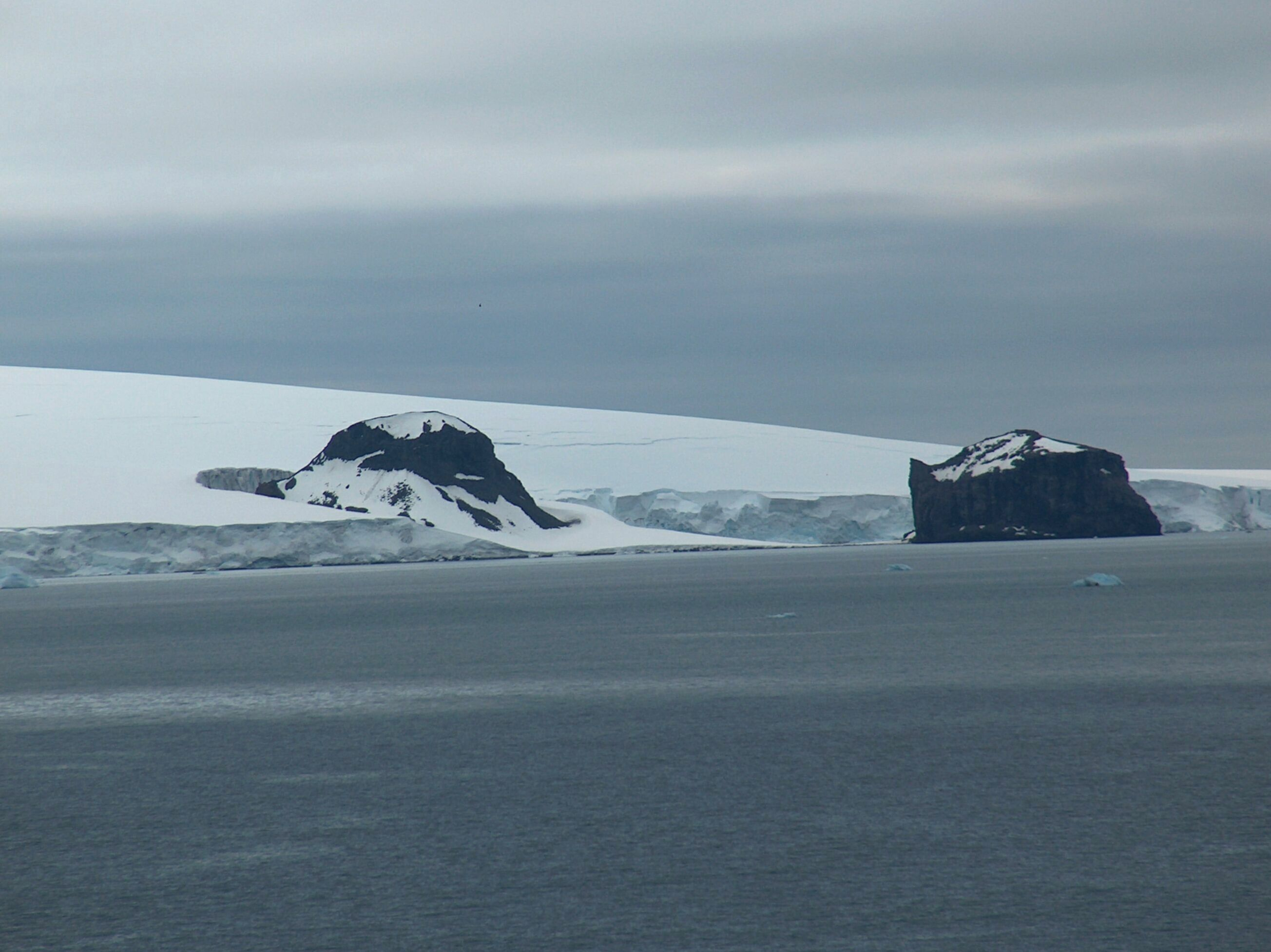
Kubrat Knoll (on the left) from Half Moon Island.

Topographic map of Livingston Island, Greenwich, Robert, Snow and Smith Islands.

Kubrat Knoll (Kubratova Mogila \ku-'bra-to-va mo-'gi-la\) is a rocky peak of elevation 140 m at the base of Inott Point, Varna Peninsula on eastern Livingston Island in the South Shetland Islands, Antarctica. It is named after Khan Kubrat, 632-668 AD, who founded the Kingdom of Great Bulgaria on the territory bounded by the Caucasus, Volga and the Carpathians in 632 AD.

== Location ==
The knoll is located at 62°31′36″S 60°01′05″W which is 700 m west by south of Inott Point, 1.93 km east of Arbanasi Nunatak and 1.7 km north of Edinburgh Hill (Bulgarian mapping in 2005 and 2009 from the Tangra 2004/05 topographic survey).

== Maps ==
- L.L. Ivanov et al. Antarctica: Livingston Island and Greenwich Island, South Shetland Islands. Scale 1:100000 topographic map. Sofia: Antarctic Place-names Commission of Bulgaria, 2005.
- L.L. Ivanov. Antarctica: Livingston Island and Greenwich, Robert, Snow and Smith Islands. Scale 1:120000 topographic map. Troyan: Manfred Wörner Foundation, 2009.
