= Elemag Reef =

Reef in the South Shetland Islands

Coordinates: 62°35′24.8″S 60°03′03″W

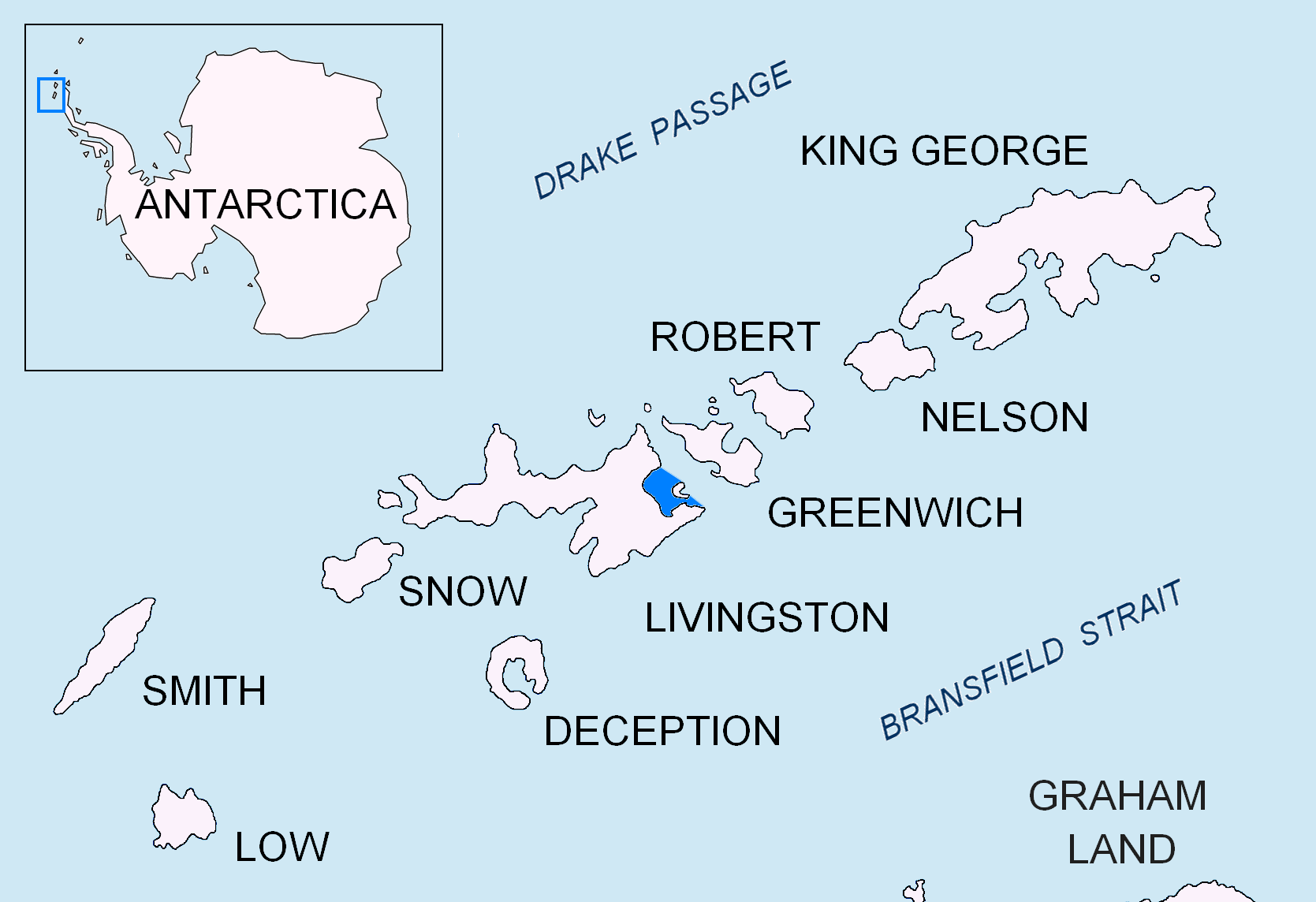
Location of Moon Bay, Livingston Island in the South Shetland Islands

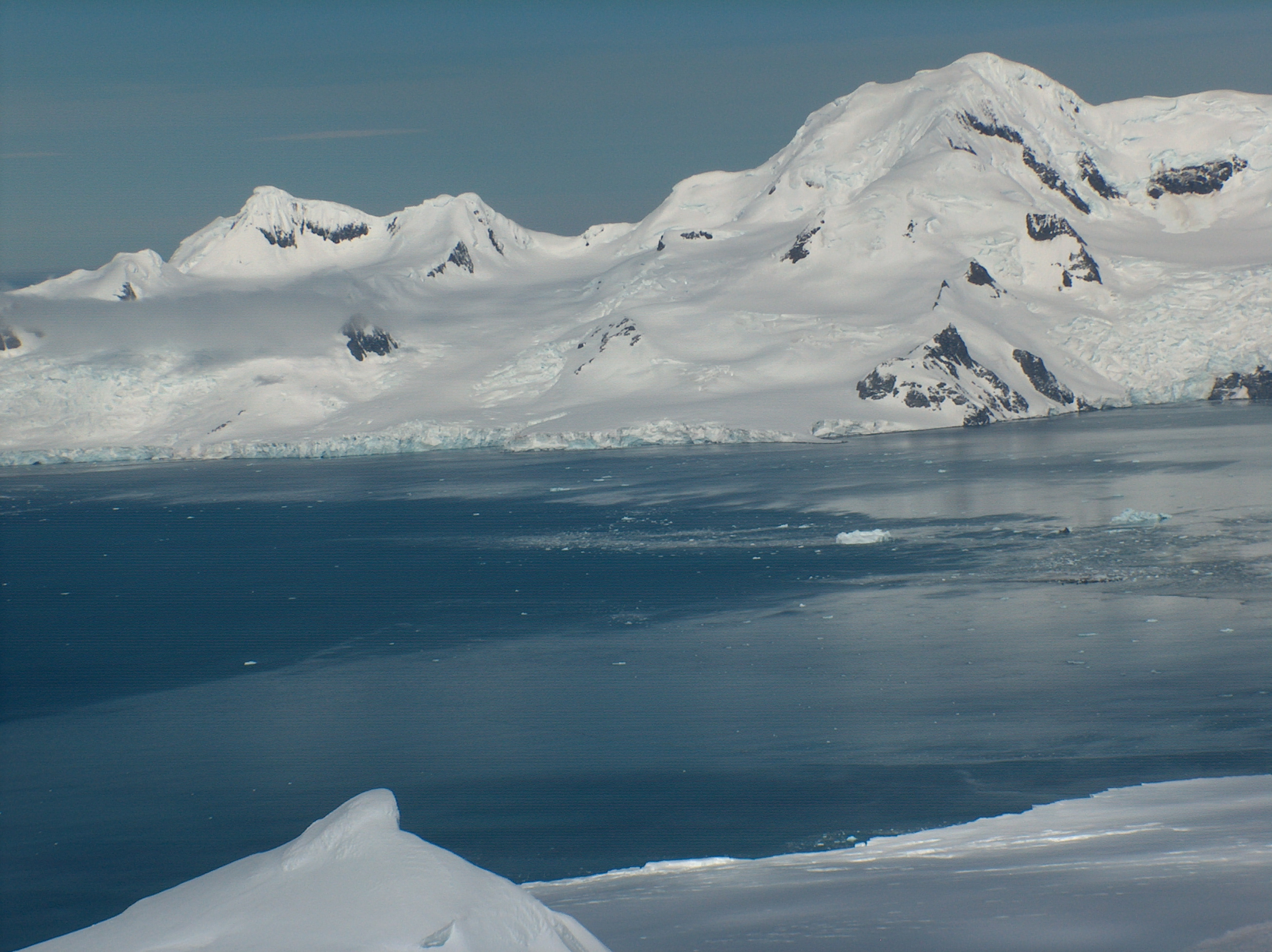
Moon Bay with Elemag Reef on the right and Burgas Peninsula in the background

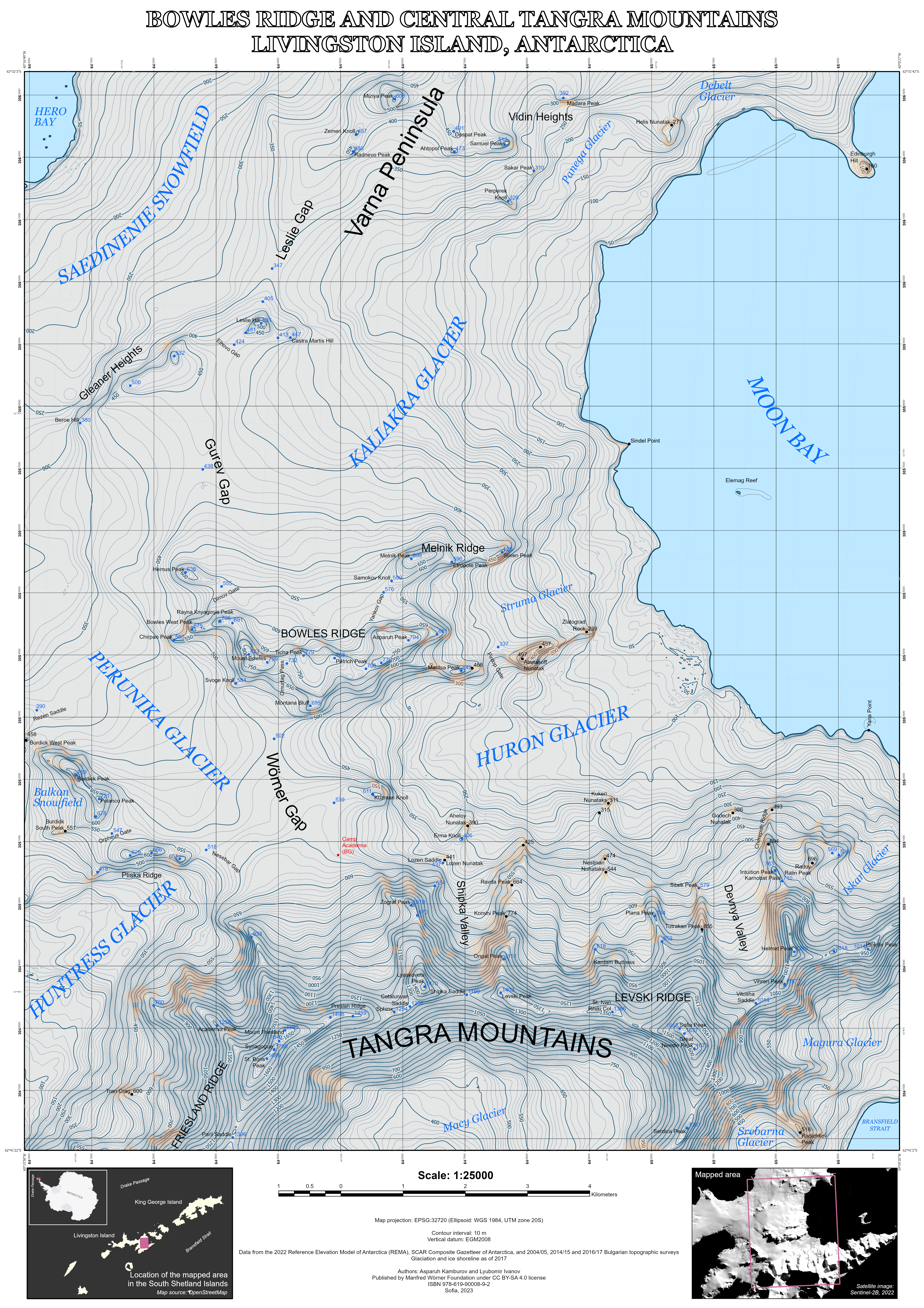
Topographic map of Bowles Ridge and central Tangra Mountains featuring Elemag Reef

Elemag Reef (Rif Elemag \'rif 'e-le-mag\) is the 100 m long in southeast-northwest direction and 40 m wide moraine reef in Moon Bay, Livingston Island in the South Shetland Islands, with a narrow shoal extending for over 400 m eastwards. Surface area 0.33 ha. Situated 5.4 km south-southwest of Edinburgh Hill, 5.95 km west of Half Moon Island, 5.18 km northwest of Rila Point, 3.3 km northeast of Zlatograd Rock and 1.85 km east-southeast of Sindel Point. Formed at the terminus of merging Struma and Huron Glaciers, it was originally named Elemag Point. The current reef configuration is due to glacier retreat of up to 1.8 km in the area in the late 20th and early 21st century. Bulgarian mapping in 2009. Bulgarian topographic survey Tangra 2004/05 and mapping in 2009.

Named after Elemag, governor of Berat during the final years of the First Bulgarian Empire.

== Maps ==
- L.L. Ivanov et al. Antarctica: Livingston Island and Greenwich Island, South Shetland Islands. Scale 1:100000 topographic map. Sofia: Antarctic Place-names Commission of Bulgaria, 2005.
- L.L. Ivanov. Antarctica: Livingston Island and Greenwich, Robert, Snow and Smith Islands. Scale 1:120000 topographic map. Troyan: Manfred Wörner Foundation, 2009. ISBN 978-954-92032-6-4
- Antarctic Digital Database (ADD). Scale 1:250000 topographic map of Antarctica. Scientific Committee on Antarctic Research (SCAR). Since 1993, regularly upgraded and updated.
- L.L. Ivanov. Antarctica: Livingston Island and Smith Island. Scale 1:100000 topographic map. Manfred Wörner Foundation, 2017. ISBN 978-619-90008-3-0
- A. Kamburov and L. Ivanov. Bowles Ridge and Central Tangra Mountains: Livingston Island, Antarctica. Scale 1:25000 map. Sofia: Manfred Wörner Foundation, 2023. ISBN 978-619-90008-6-1
