= Dospat Peak =

Location of Varna Peninsula on Livingston Island in the South Shetland Islands.

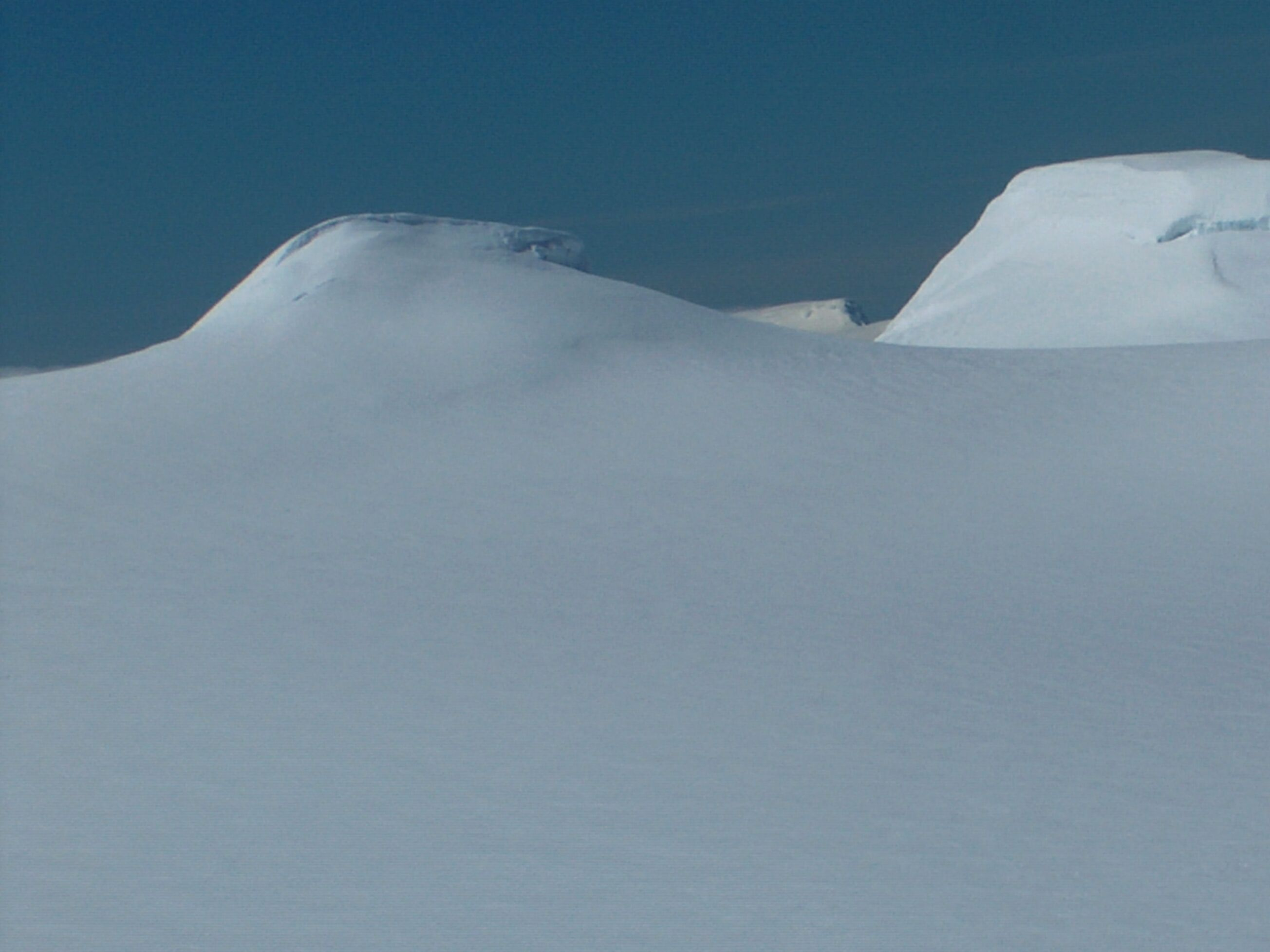
Dospat Peak from Zemen Knoll.

Topographic map of Livingston Island and Smith Island.

Dospat Peak (Bulgarian: връх Доспат, romanized: vrah Dospat, IPA: [ˈvrɤɣ dosˈpat]; Greek: κορυφή Δοσπάτης, romanized: koryfí Dospátis, IPA: [koriˈfi ðosˈpatis]) is a 500 m (1,600 ft) mountain peak in the Vidin Heights on Varna Peninsula, Livingston Island, part of the South Shetland Islands off the coast of Antarctica. The peak is named after the town of Dospat in the Rhodope Mountains, Bulgaria.

== Location ==
The peak is located at 62°32′23″S 60°08′45″W which is 1 km east-southeast of Miziya Peak, 930 m south of Krichim Peak and 340 m north of Ahtopol Peak. (Bulgarian mapping in 2005 and 2009 from the Tangra 2004/05 topographic survey.)

== Maps ==
- L.L. Ivanov et al. Antarctica: Livingston Island and Greenwich Island, South Shetland Islands. Scale 1:100000 topographic map. Sofia: Antarctic Place-names Commission of Bulgaria, 2005.
- L.L. Ivanov. Antarctica: Livingston Island and Greenwich, Robert, Snow and Smith Islands. Scale 1:120000 topographic map. Troyan: Manfred Wörner Foundation, 2009.
- A. Kamburov and L. Ivanov. Bowles Ridge and Central Tangra Mountains: Livingston Island, Antarctica. Scale 1:25000 map. Sofia: Manfred Wörner Foundation, 2023. ISBN 978-619-90008-6-1
