= Debelt Glacier =

Glacier in Antarctica

- Location of Varna Peninsula on Livingston Island in the South Shetland Islands

- Location within South Shetland Islands Location within Antarctica
- Location: Livingston Island
- Coordinates: 62°31′55″S 60°03′46″W
- Thickness: unknown
- Terminus: Moon Bay
- Status: unknown

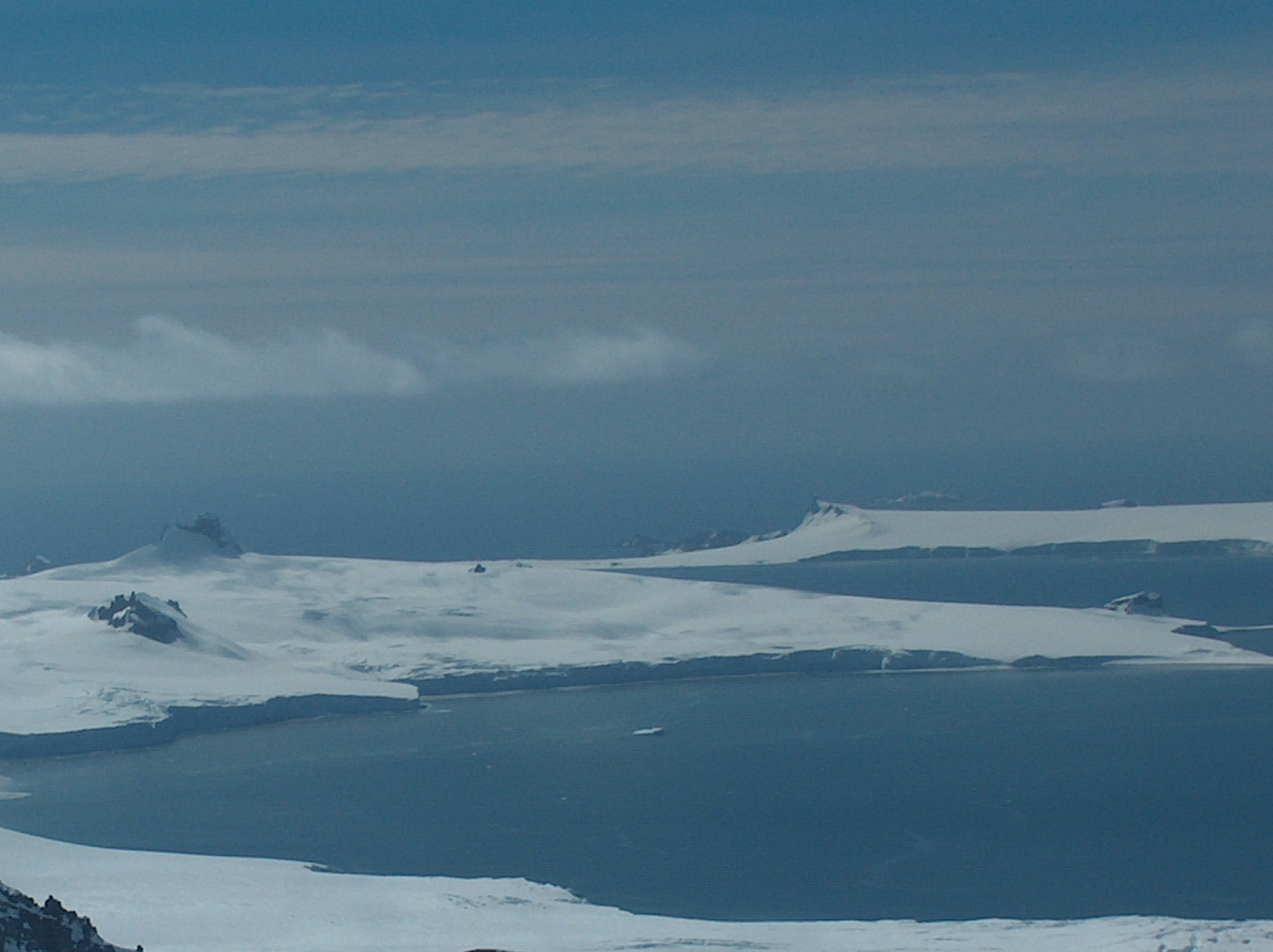
Debelt Glacier from Ongal Peak.

Topographic map of Livingston Island and Smith Island

The Debelt Glacier (Bulgarian: ледник Дебелт, romanized: lednik Debelt, IPA: [ˈlɛdniɡ ˈdɛbɛɫt]) on Varna Peninsula, Livingston Island in the South Shetland Islands, Antarctica is situated southeast of Rose Valley Glacier and northeast of Panega Glacier. It drains the southeastern slopes of Vidin Heights and flows into Moon Bay between Edinburgh Hill and Helis Nunatak. The glacier extends three km in an east-west direction, and 1.5 km in north-south direction.

Debelt glacier is centred at 62°31′55″S 60°03′46″W (62.5319° S; 60.0628° W). Bulgarian topographic survey Tangra 2004/05 and mapping in 2005 and 2009.

The feature is named after the settlement of Debelt in Southeastern Bulgaria, successor of the ancient town of Deultum.

Registered in the SCAR Composite Antarctic Gazetteer.

== See also ==
- List of glaciers in the Antarctic
- Glaciology

== Maps ==
- L.L. Ivanov et al. Antarctica: Livingston Island and Greenwich Island, South Shetland Islands. Scale 1:100000 topographic map. Sofia: Antarctic Place-names Commission of Bulgaria, 2005.
- L.L. Ivanov. Antarctica: Livingston Island and Greenwich, Robert, Snow and Smith Islands. Scale 1:120000 topographic map. Troyan: Manfred Wörner Foundation, 2009. ISBN 978-954-92032-6-4
- A. Kamburov and L. Ivanov. Bowles Ridge and Central Tangra Mountains: Livingston Island, Antarctica. Scale 1:25000 map. Sofia: Manfred Wörner Foundation, 2023. ISBN 978-619-90008-6-1
