= Karavelova Point =

Place in Antarctica

Location of Varna Peninsula on Livingston Island in the South Shetland Islands

Topographic map of Livingston, Greenwich, Robert, Snow and Smith islands

Karavelova Point or Nos Karavelova (/ˈnɒs kɑːrəˈvɛloʊvə/ is on the northeast coast of Varna Peninsula, Livingston Island in the South Shetland Islands, Antarctica forming the south side of Lister Cove. It is named after Ekaterina Karavelova (1860–1947), translator, author and woman activist.

== Location ==
The point is located at 62°30′12″S 60°03′22″W, which is 2.1 km south of Pomorie Point, 7 km southeast of Williams Point and 3.6 km northwest of Inott Point.

== Maps ==
- L.L. Ivanov et al. Antarctica: Livingston Island and Greenwich Island, South Shetland Islands. Scale 1:100000 topographic map. Sofia: Antarctic Place-names Commission of Bulgaria, 2005.
- L.L. Ivanov. Antarctica: Livingston Island and Greenwich, Robert, Snow and Smith Islands. Scale 1:120000 topographic map. Troyan: Manfred Wörner Foundation, 2009.
