= Helis Nunatak =

Rocky peak in the South Shetland Islands, Antarctica

Location of Varna Peninsula on Livingston Island in the South Shetland Islands.

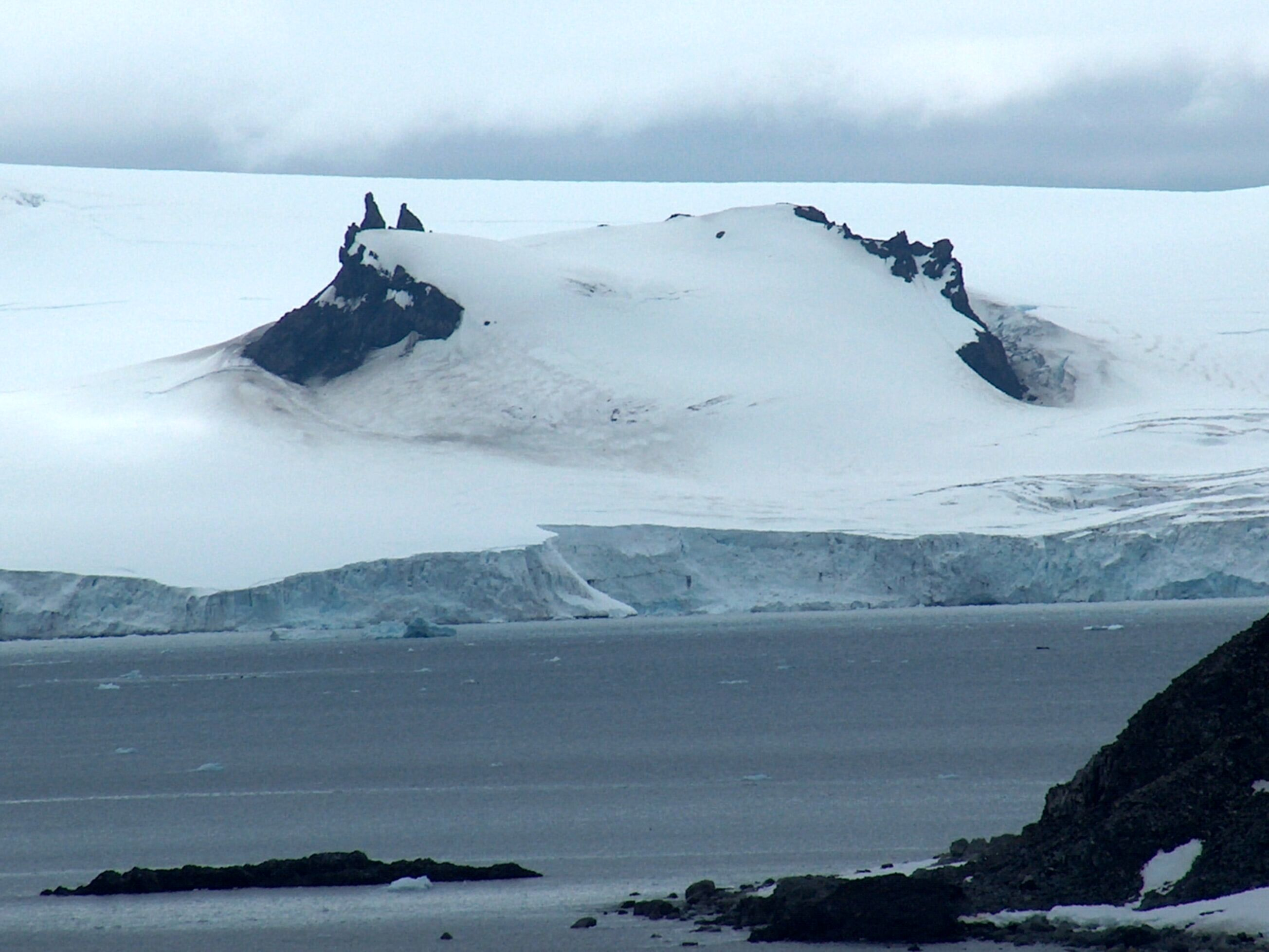
Helis Nunatak from Half Moon Island.

Topographic map of Livingston Island, Greenwich, Robert, Snow and Smith Islands.

Helis Nunatak (Nunatak Helis \'nu-na-tak 'he-lis\) is a crown-shaped rocky peak of elevation 340 m in Vidin Heights on Varna Peninsula, Livingston Island in the South Shetland Islands, Western Antarctica. The peak is named after the ancient Thracian capital town of Helis whose remains are located at Sveshtari, northeastern Bulgaria.

== Location ==
The peak is located at 62°32′25″S 60°04′40″W which is 3 km west of Edinburgh Hill, 1.9 km south of Sharp Peak and 1.85 km east-southeast of Madara Peak (Bulgarian mapping in 2005 and 2009 from the Tangra 2004/05 topographic survey).

== Maps ==
- L.L. Ivanov et al. Antarctica: Livingston Island and Greenwich Island, South Shetland Islands. Scale 1:100000 topographic map. Sofia: Antarctic Place-names Commission of Bulgaria, 2005.
- L.L. Ivanov. Antarctica: Livingston Island and Greenwich, Robert, Snow and Smith Islands. Scale 1:120000 topographic map. Troyan: Manfred Wörner Foundation, 2009.
- A. Kamburov and L. Ivanov. Bowles Ridge and Central Tangra Mountains: Livingston Island, Antarctica. Scale 1:25000 map. Sofia: Manfred Wörner Foundation, 2023. ISBN 978-619-90008-6-1
