= Bagryana Point =

Rounded ice-free tipped point in Antarctica

Location of Greenwich Island in the South Shetland Islands

Topographic map featuring Bagryana Point

Bagryana Point (Bulgarian: нос Багряна, ‘Nos Bagryana’ \'nos ba-'grya-na\) is the rounded ice-free tipped point on the southwest coast of Greenwich Island in Antarctica surmounted by Telerig Nunatak. It is named after the Bulgarian poet Elisaveta Bagryana (1893-1991).

== Location ==
Bagryana Point is located at 62°30′13″S 59°56′09″W, which is 2 km southeast of Kerseblept Nunatak, 1.27 km southwest of Telerig Nunatak, 1.77 km west-northwest of Yovkov Point, and 4.3 km northeast of Inott Point on Livingston Island. British mapping in 1968, and Bulgarian in 2005, 2009 and 2017.

== Maps ==
- L.L. Ivanov et al. Antarctica: Livingston Island and Greenwich Island, South Shetland Islands. Scale 1:100000 topographic map. Sofia: Antarctic Place-names Commission of Bulgaria, 2005.
- L.L. Ivanov. Antarctica: Livingston Island and Greenwich, Robert, Snow and Smith Islands. Scale 1:120000 topographic map. Troyan: Manfred Wörner Foundation, 2009.
- Antarctic Digital Database (ADD). Scale 1:250000 topographic map of Antarctica. Scientific Committee on Antarctic Research (SCAR). Since 1993, regularly upgraded and updated
