= Moon Bay =

Bay on Livingston Island, Antarctica

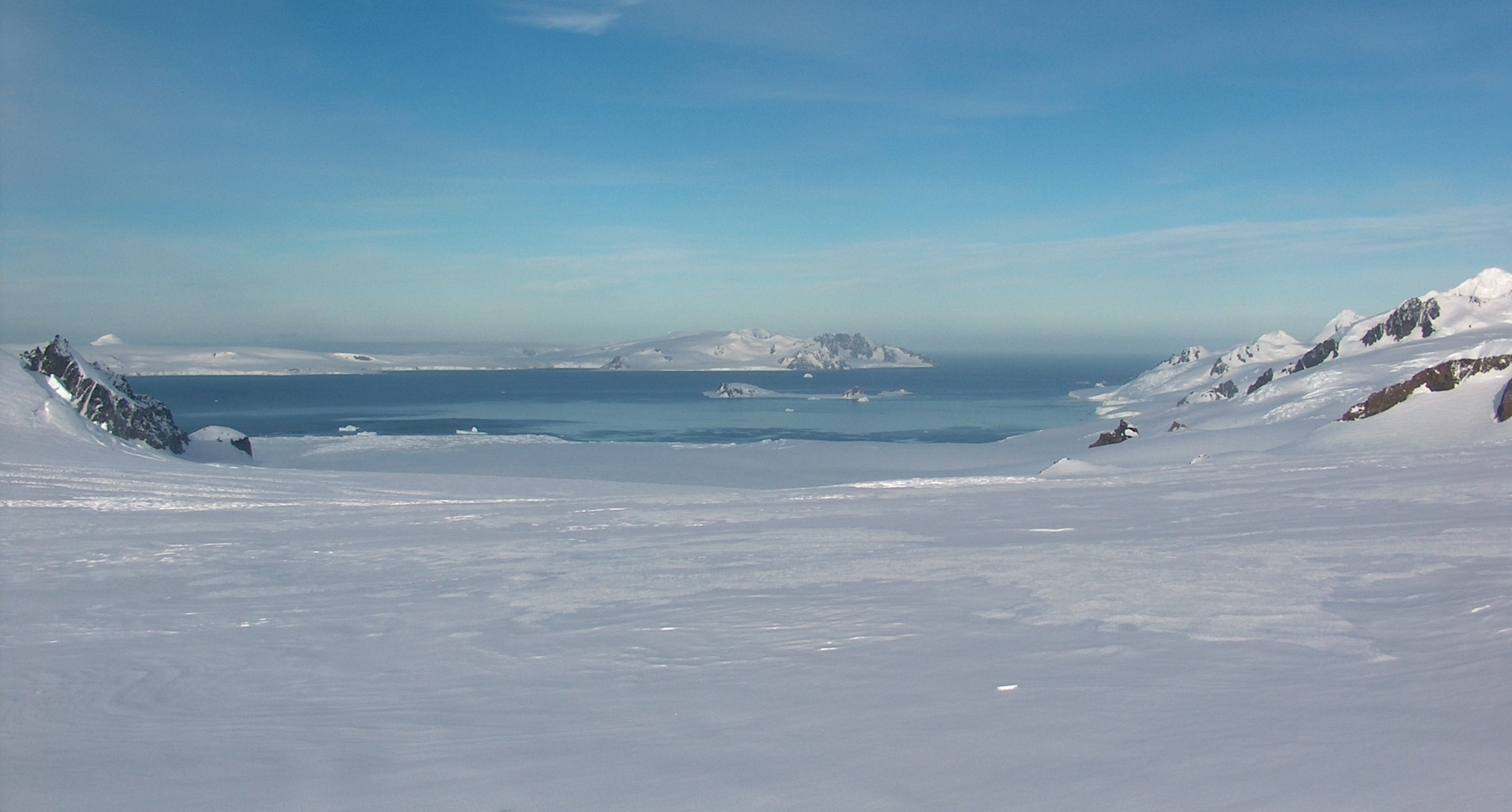
- Moon Bay from Camp Academia, with Half Moon Island and Greenwich Island in the background

- Location within Antarctica
- Location: Livingston Island, South Shetland Islands, Antarctica
- Coordinates: 62°35′S 60°0′W
- Max. width: 7 nautical miles (13 km)
- Islands: Half Moon Island

Moon Bay is a bay 7 nautical miles (13 km) wide which recedes 4 nautical miles (7 km) between Edinburgh Hill and Renier Point, on the east side of Livingston Island, in the South Shetland Islands off Antarctica. The glaciers Sopot Ice Piedmont, Iskar, Huron, Struma, Kaliakra, Panega and Debelt feed the bay. Both Half Moon Island and Elemag Reef lie in Moon Bay.

The bay was known to sealers in the area as early as 1821. It was recharted in 1935 by Discovery Investigations personnel on the Discovery II, and probably named by them for nearby Half Moon Island, which lies in the entrance to the bay.

== Maps ==
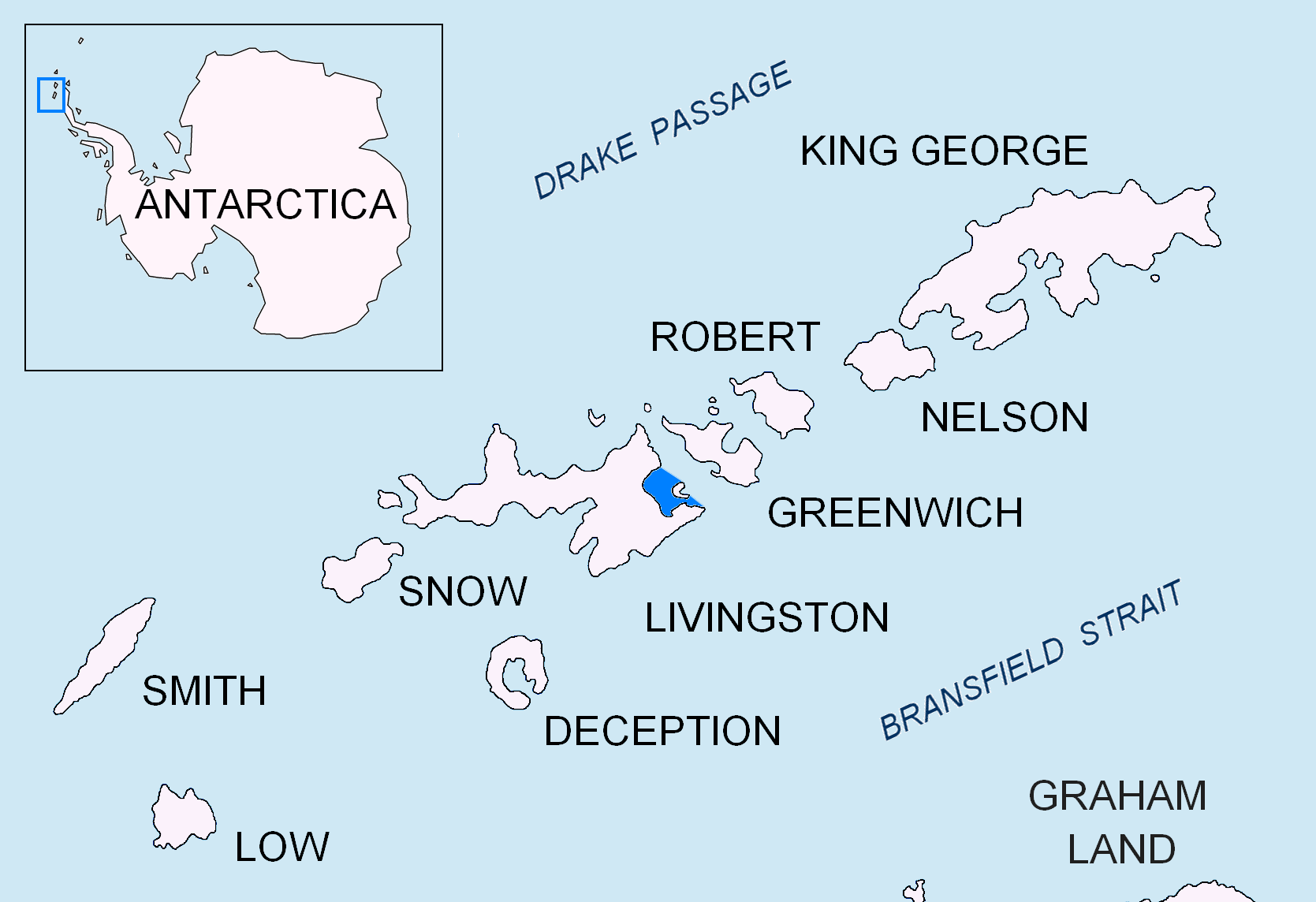
Location of Moon Bay, Livingston Island in the South Shetland Islands.

- South Shetland Islands. Scale 1:200000 topographic map. DOS 610 Sheet W 62 60. Tolworth, UK, 1968.
- South Shetland Islands. Scale 1:200000 topographic map. DOS 610 Sheet W 62 58. Tolworth, UK, 1968.
- Islas Livingston y Decepción. Mapa topográfico a escala 1:100000. Madrid: Servicio Geográfico del Ejército, 1991.
- L.L. Ivanov et al. Antarctica: Livingston Island and Greenwich Island, South Shetland Islands. Scale 1:100000 topographic map. Sofia: Antarctic Place-names Commission of Bulgaria, 2005.
- L.L. Ivanov. Antarctica: Livingston Island and Greenwich, Robert, Snow and Smith Islands. Scale 1:120000 topographic map. Troyan: Manfred Wörner Foundation, 2009. ISBN 978-954-92032-6-4
- Antarctic Digital Database (ADD). Scale 1:250000 topographic map of Antarctica. Scientific Committee on Antarctic Research (SCAR), 1993–2016.
- A. Kamburov and L. Ivanov. Bowles Ridge and Central Tangra Mountains: Livingston Island, Antarctica. Scale 1:25000 map. Sofia: Manfred Wörner Foundation, 2023. ISBN 978-619-90008-6-1
