= Debelt =

Debelt Дебелт
- Village
- Location within Bulgaria
- Coordinates: 42°24′N 27°16′E
- Country: Bulgaria
- Province: Burgas Province
- Municipality: Sredets

Government
  - Mayor: Nikolai Sacianov (GERB)

Area
  - Total: 49.318 km^{2} (19.042 sq mi)
- Elevation: 46 m (151 ft)

Population (2013)
  - Total: 1,965
- Time zone: UTC+2 (EET)
  - Summer (DST): UTC+3 (EEST)
- Postal Code: 8314

Debelt (Bulgarian: Дебелт) is a village in Burgas Province in southeastern Bulgaria. It is located in the municipality of Sredets.

== History ==
Debelt is located near the ruins of the city of Develtos. During the Russo-Turkish War of 1828-1829, the region was occupied by Russia with the support of the Christian population. However, after the Treaty of Adrianople in 1829, the Christian population of Debelt abandoned the village and travelled with the Russian army as it withdrew from Ottoman territory. Most of the former inhabitants of Debelt settled in Bessarabia.

In 1864, the Ottoman government repopulated Debelt with Circassians, after which the village became known as Yakezli (Bulgarian: Якезли). Following the Russo-Turkish War of 1877-1878, the Circassians abandoned the village. In 1903, during the Ilinden–Preobrazhenie Uprising, the village served as an important logistical base of the IMRO and training camps were established. After the rebellion, a refugee camp was built.

After the Second Balkan War in 1913, 76 Bulgarian families from East Thrace settled in the village. On 14 August 1934, the village of Yakezli was renamed Debelt.

Debelt Glacier on Livingston Island in the South Shetland Islands, Antarctica is named after Debelt.

== Bibliography ==
- Karayotov, Ivan; Raychevski, Stoyan; Ivanov, Mitko (2011). История на Бургас: От древността до средата на ХХ век (in Bulgarian).
- Mitchev, Nicholas; Koledarov, Peter (1989). Речник на селищата и селищните имена в България 1878 – 1987 (in Bulgarian).
- Raychevski, Stoyan (2002). Източна Тракия: История, етноси, преселения XV-ХХ век (in Bulgarian).
