= Elemag =

Byzantine official

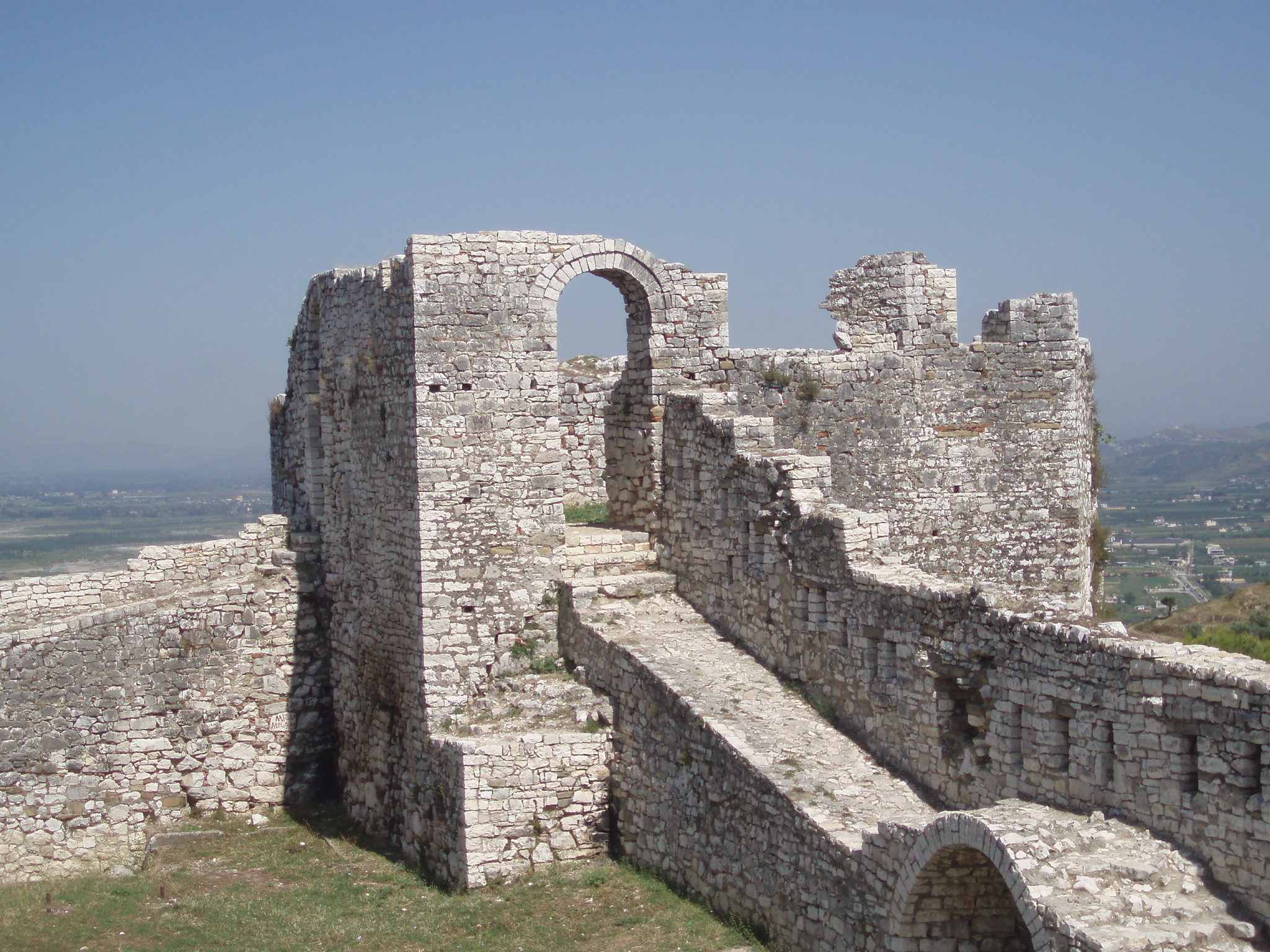
The Berat Castle, known during the Bulgarian rule as the Belgrad Castle

Elemag (Greek: Ἐλεμάγος) or Elinag Phrantzes (Ἐλίναγος ὁ Φραντζὴς) was, according to the history of John Skylitzes, the governor of Belegrada (modern Berat in Albania) for the First Bulgarian Empire in 1018, when the Byzantine emperor Basil II completed the Byzantine conquest of Bulgaria. Elemag, together with his co-governors, went and met Basil II at Stagoi, and declared his submission, surrendering his province to the emperor.

He was granted the title of patrikios and sent to live at Thessalonica. Elemag was later accused of conspiring to restore an independent Bulgarian realm along with the patrikios Gabras, but whereas Gabras fled, was captured, and blinded, Elemag remained behind, denied the accusations, and was reinstated in his rank. Elemag may also be the Phrantzes who was a donor of the St. Panteleimon Monastery on Mount Athos.

Elemag Reef on Livingston Island, Antarctica, has been named after him.

== Sources ==
- Curta, Florin (2006). Southeastern Europe in the Middle Ages, 500–1250. Cambridge: Cambridge University Press. ISBN 978-0-521-81539-0.
- Lilie, Ralph-Johannes; Ludwig, Claudia; Pratsch, Thomas; Zielke, Beate (2013). Prosopographie der mittelbyzantinischen Zeit Online. Berlin-Brandenburgische Akademie der Wissenschaften. Nach Vorarbeiten F. Winkelmanns erstellt (in German). Berlin and Boston: De Gruyter.
