= Lister Cove =

Cove in the South Shetland Islands, Antarctica

Coordinates: 62°29′42.5″S 60°04′19.8″W

Location of Varna Peninsula in the South Shetland Islands.

Topographic map of Livingston Island.

Lister Cove is a 2.1 km wide cove indenting for 1.55 km the northeast coast of Varna Peninsula, Livingston Island in the South Shetland Islands, Antarctica south of Pomorie Point and north of Karavelova Point. The cove is fed by Rose Valley Glacier.

It was named by James Weddell. British mapping in 1825 and 1968, and Bulgarian mapping in 2005 and 2009 from the Tangra 2004/05 survey.

== Maps ==
- South Shetland Islands. Scale 1:200000 topographic map No. 5657. DOS 610 – W 62 60. Tolworth, UK, 1968.
- Islas Livingston y Decepción. Mapa topográfico a escala 1:100000. Madrid: Servicio Geográfico del Ejército, 1991.
- L.L. Ivanov et al. Antarctica: Livingston Island and Greenwich Island, South Shetland Islands. Scale 1:100000 topographic map. Sofia: Antarctic Place-names Commission of Bulgaria, 2005.
- L.L. Ivanov. Antarctica: Livingston Island and Greenwich, Robert, Snow and Smith Islands. Scale 1:120000 topographic map. Troyan: Manfred Wörner Foundation, 2009. ISBN 978-954-92032-6-4
- Antarctic Digital Database (ADD). Scale 1:250000 topographic map of Antarctica. Scientific Committee on Antarctic Research (SCAR). Since 1993, regularly upgraded and updated.
- L.L. Ivanov. Antarctica: Livingston Island and Smith Island. Scale 1:100000 topographic map. Manfred Wörner Foundation, 2017. ISBN 978-619-90008-3-0
