= Samuel Peak =

Peak on Livingston Island, in the South Shetland Islands, Antarctica

Location of Varna Peninsula on Livingston Island in the South Shetland Islands.

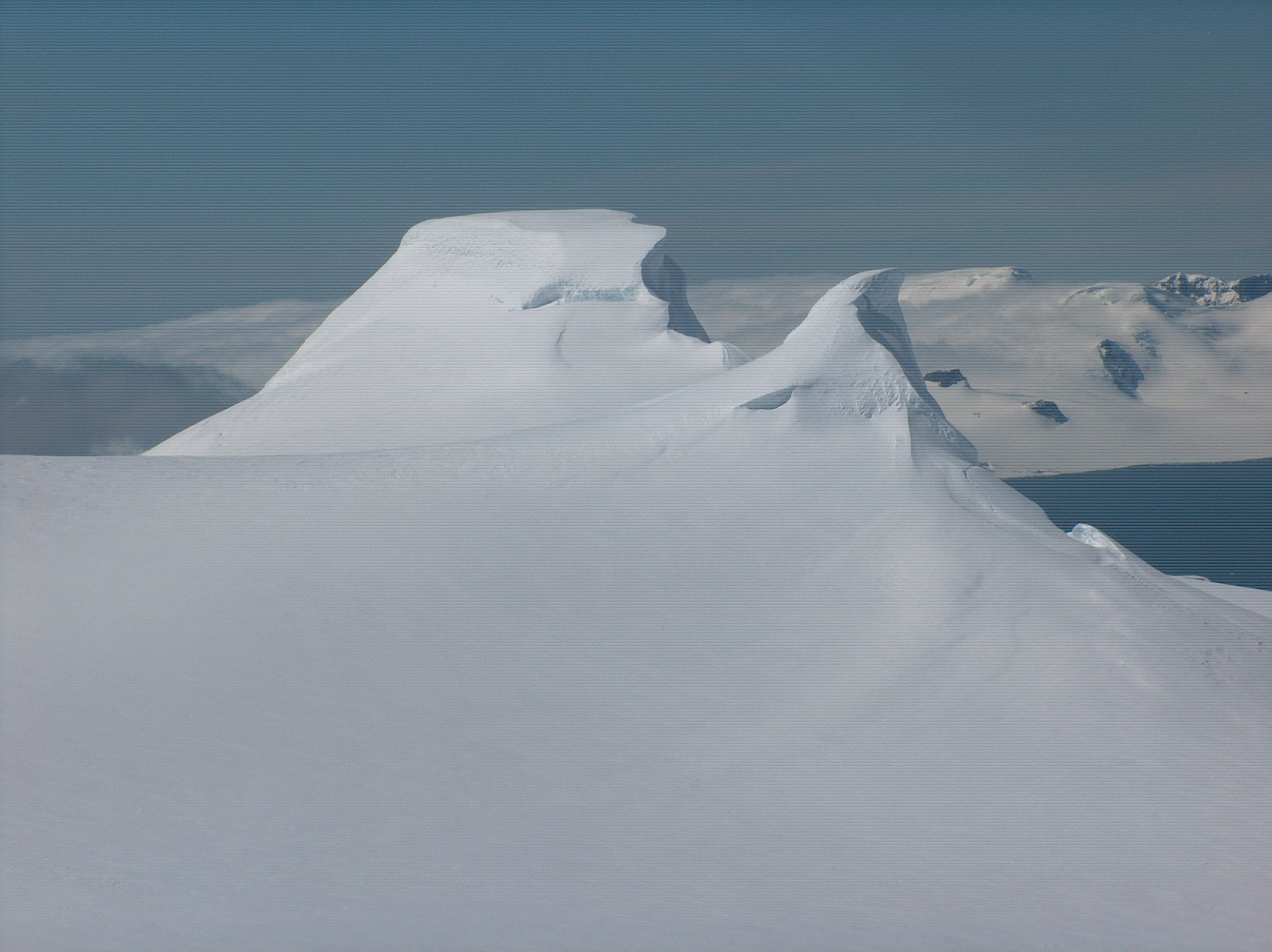
Samuel Peak from Radnevo Peak, with Ahtopol Peak in the foreground.

Topographic map of Livingston Island, Greenwich, Robert, Snow and Smith Islands.

Samuel Peak is the 540 m peak in central Vidin Heights, Livingston Island, in the South Shetland Islands, Antarctica. Surmounting Panega Glacier to the east and Kaliakra Glacier to the south.

The peak is named after the American sealing ship Samuel under Captain Robert Inott, which visited the islands in 1820–21.

== Location ==
Samuel Peak is located at 62°32′30″S 60°07′51″W, which is 4.78 km northeast of Leslie Hill, 1.9 km east-southeast of Miziya Peak, 5.7 km west of Edinburgh Hill and 6.76 km north by east of Melnik Peak. (British mapping in 1968, Bulgarian in 2005 and 2009).

== Maps ==
- L.L. Ivanov et al. Antarctica: Livingston Island and Greenwich Island, South Shetland Islands. Scale 1:100000 topographic map. Sofia: Antarctic Place-names Commission of Bulgaria, 2005.
- L.L. Ivanov. Antarctica: Livingston Island and Greenwich, Robert, Snow and Smith Islands. Scale 1:120000 topographic map. Troyan: Manfred Wörner Foundation, 2009. ISBN 978-954-92032-6-4
- A. Kamburov and L. Ivanov. Bowles Ridge and Central Tangra Mountains: Livingston Island, Antarctica. Scale 1:25000 map. Sofia: Manfred Wörner Foundation, 2023. ISBN 978-619-90008-6-1
