= Rose Valley Glacier =

Glacier in Antarctica

- Location of Varna Peninsula on Livingston Island in the South Shetland Islands

- Location within South Shetland Islands Location within Antarctica
- Location: Livingston Island; South Shetland Islands
- Coordinates: 62°30′30″S 60°06′07″W
- Length: 2.8 nautical miles (5.2 km; 3.2 mi)
- Width: 2 nautical miles (3.7 km; 2.3 mi)
- Thickness: unknown
- Terminus: Lister Cove
- Status: unknown

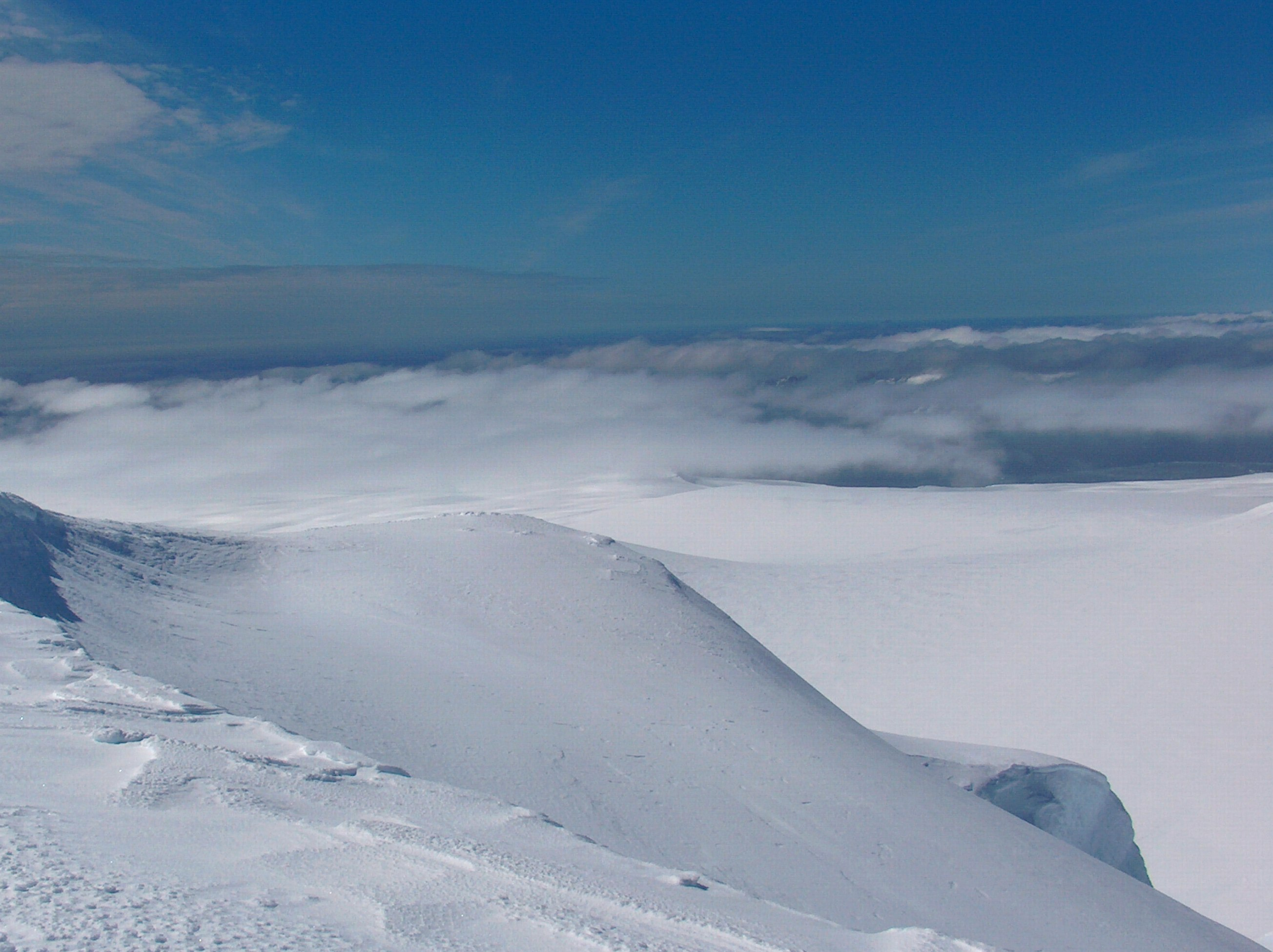
Rose Valley Glacier from Miziya Peak

Topographic map of Livingston Island and Smith Island

Rose Valley Glacier (Bulgarian: ледник Розова долина, romanized: lednik Rozova dolina, IPA: [ˈlɛdnik ˈrɔzovɐ doliˈna]) is a glacier on Varna Peninsula, eastern Livingston Island in the South Shetland Islands, Antarctica. It is northeast of Saedinenie Snowfield, northwest of Debelt Glacier and north of Panega Glacier. It extends 5.2 kilometres (3.2 mi) in the southeast–northwest direction and 3.7 kilometres (2.3 mi) in the southwest–northeast direction. The glacier drains the northeast slopes of Vidin Heights to flow into Lister Cove and McFarlane Strait between Pomorie Point and Inott Point.

The feature is named after the Valley of Roses in central Bulgaria.

== Location ==
The glacier is located at 62°30′30″S 60°06′07″W (Bulgarian topographic survey Tangra 2004/05 and mapping in 2005 and 2009).

== See also ==
- List of glaciers in the Antarctic
- Glaciology

== Maps ==
- L.L. Ivanov et al. Antarctica: Livingston Island and Greenwich Island, South Shetland Islands. Scale 1:100000 topographic map. Sofia: Antarctic Place-names Commission of Bulgaria, 2005.
- L.L. Ivanov. Antarctica: Livingston Island and Greenwich, Robert, Snow and Smith Islands. Scale 1:120000 topographic map. Troyan: Manfred Wörner Foundation, 2009. ISBN 978-954-92032-6-4
