= Inott Point =

Point on Livingston Island

Location of Varna Peninsula, Livingston Island in the South Shetland Islands.

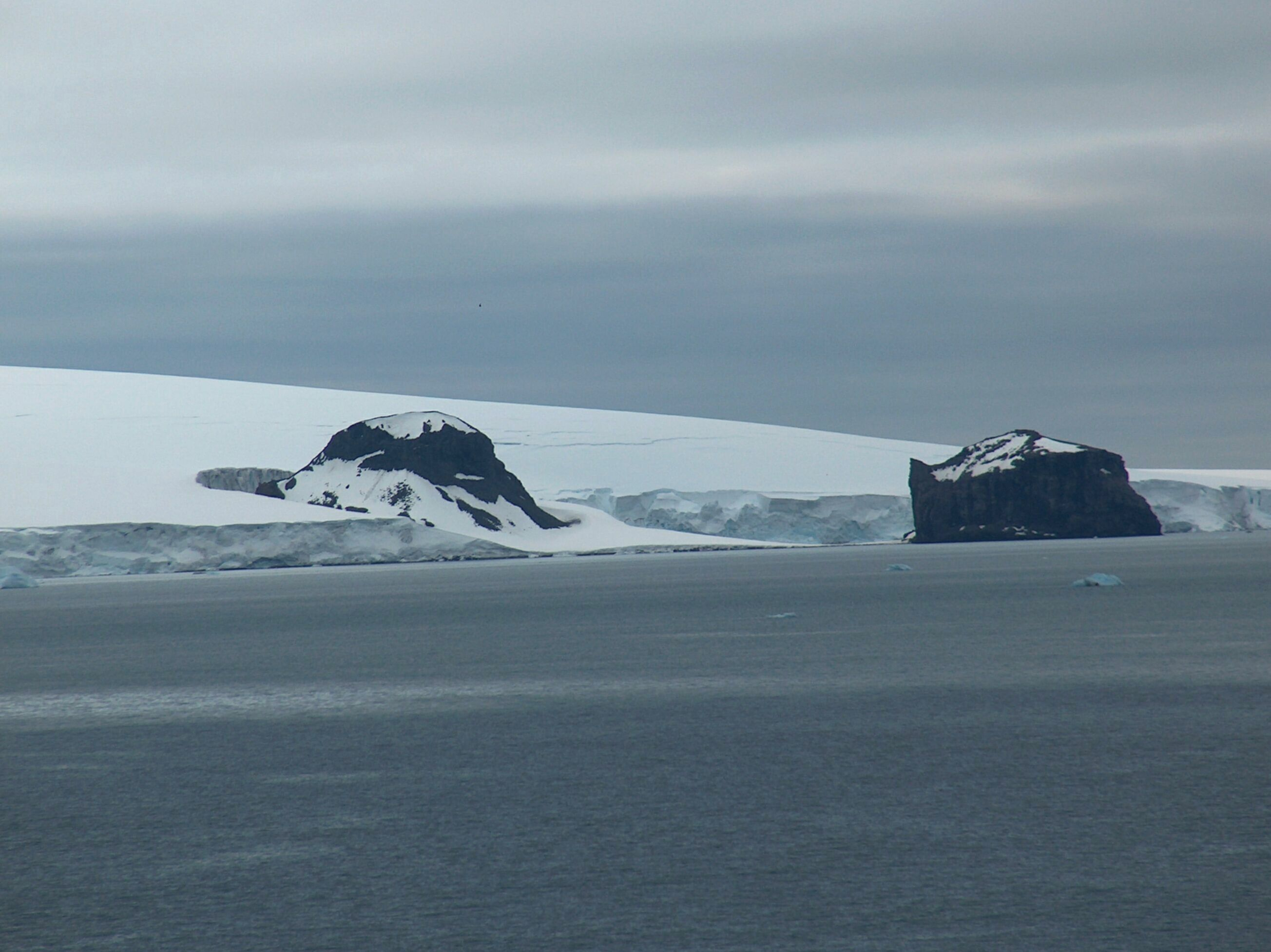
Inott Point from Half Moon Island, with Kubrat Knoll on the left.

Topographic map of Livingston Island, Greenwich, Robert, Snow and Smith Islands.

Inott Point (62°31′31″S 60°00′17″W) is a point 1 nautical mile (2 km) north-northeast of Edinburgh Hill forming the eastern extremity of Varna Peninsula on Livingston Island in the South Shetland Islands, Antarctica. Situated 4.3 km southwest of Bagryana Point on Greenwich Island across McFarlane Strait. In association with the names of nineteenth century sealers in this area, it was named by the UK Antarctic Place-Names Committee after Captain Robert Inott, Master of the American sealing ship Samuel (after which Samuel Peak was named) from Nantucket, who visited the South Shetland Islands in 1820–21.

== Maps ==
- L.L. Ivanov et al. Antarctica: Livingston Island and Greenwich Island, South Shetland Islands. Scale 1:100000 topographic map. Sofia: Antarctic Place-names Commission of Bulgaria, 2005.
- L.L. Ivanov. Antarctica: Livingston Island and Greenwich, Robert, Snow and Smith Islands. Scale 1:120000 topographic map. Troyan: Manfred Wörner Foundation, 2009. ISBN 978-954-92032-6-4
- Antarctic Digital Database (ADD). Scale 1:250000 topographic map of Antarctica. Scientific Committee on Antarctic Research (SCAR). Since 1993, regularly upgraded and updated.
- L.L. Ivanov. Antarctica: Livingston Island and Smith Island. Scale 1:100000 topographic map. Manfred Wörner Foundation, 2017. ISBN 978-619-90008-3-0
