= Panega Glacier =

Glacier in Antarctica

- Location of Varna Peninsula on Livingston Island in the South Shetland Islands

- Location within South Shetland Islands Location within Antarctica
- Location: Livingston Island; South Shetland Islands
- Coordinates: 62°32′25″S 60°06′49″W
- Length: 2 nautical miles (3.7 km; 2.3 mi)
- Width: 1.6 nautical miles (3.0 km; 1.8 mi)
- Thickness: unknown
- Terminus: Moon Bay
- Status: unknown

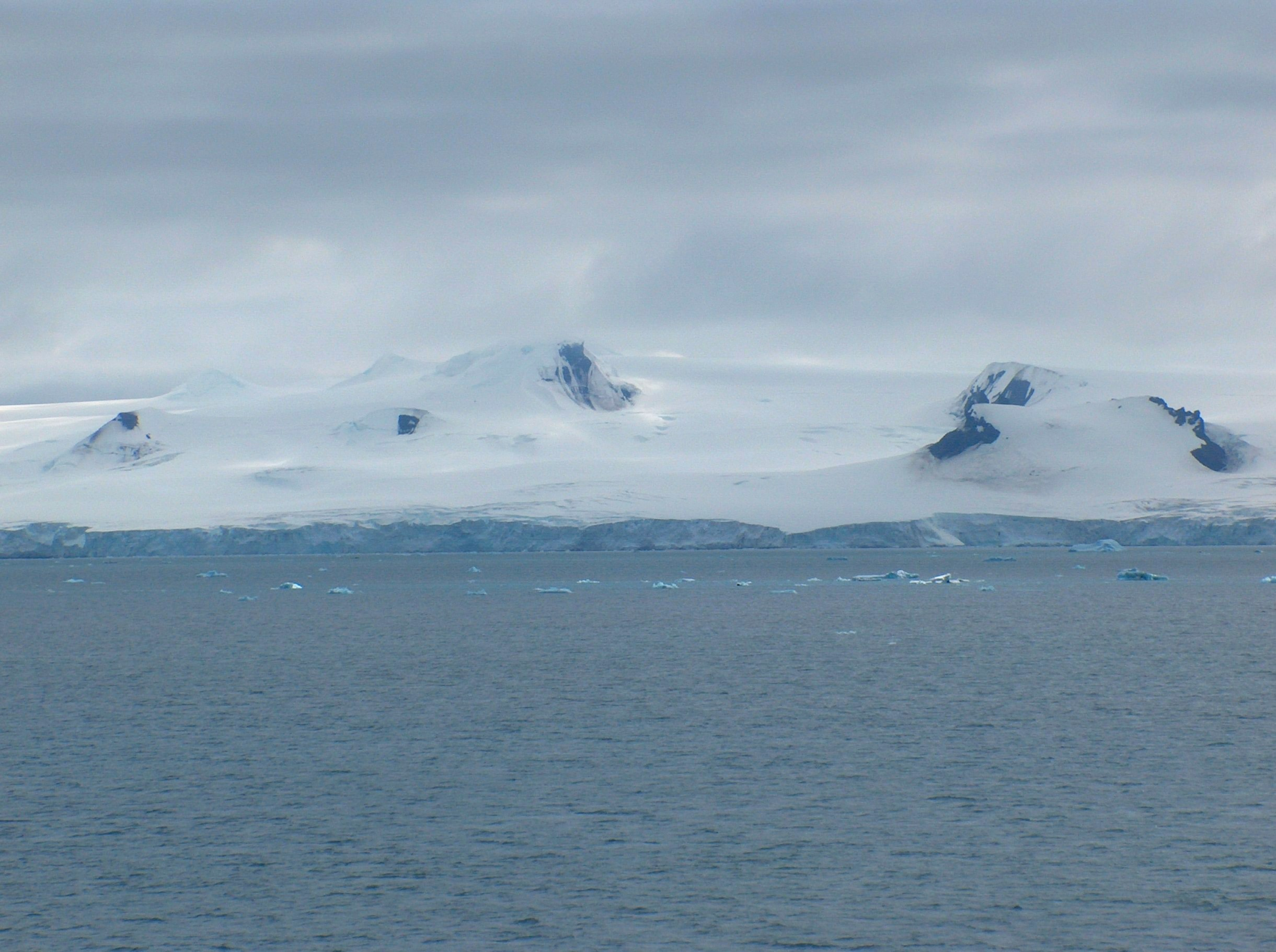
Panega Glacier from Half Moon Island

Topographic map of Livingston Island and Smith Island

Panega Glacier (Bulgarian: ледник Панега, romanized: lednik Panega, IPA: [ˈlɛdnik ˈpanɛɡɐ]) on Varna Peninsula, Livingston Island in the South Shetland Islands, Antarctica is situated southeast of the northeastern portion of Saedinenie Snowfield, south of Rose Valley Glacier, southwest of Debelt Glacier and north of lower Kaliakra Glacier. It drains the southeast slopes of Vidin Heights and flows into Moon Bay between Helis Nunatak and Perperek Knoll. The glacier extends 2 nautical miles (3.7 km; 2.3 mi) in the southeast–northwest direction, and 1.6 nautical miles (3.0 km; 1.8 mi) in the southwest–northeast direction. It is named after Zlatna Panega River in northern Bulgaria.

== Location ==
The glacier is centred at 62°32′25″S 60°06′49″W (Bulgarian topographic survey Tangra 2004/05 and mapping in 2005 and 2009).

== See also ==
- List of glaciers in the Antarctic
- Glaciology

== Maps ==
- L.L. Ivanov et al. Antarctica: Livingston Island and Greenwich Island, South Shetland Islands. Scale 1:100000 topographic map. Sofia: Antarctic Place-names Commission of Bulgaria, 2005.
- L.L. Ivanov. Antarctica: Livingston Island and Greenwich, Robert, Snow and Smith Islands. Scale 1:120000 topographic map. Troyan: Manfred Wörner Foundation, 2009. ISBN 978-954-92032-6-4
- Antarctic Digital Database (ADD). Scale 1:250000 topographic map of Antarctica. Scientific Committee on Antarctic Research (SCAR). Since 1993, regularly upgraded and updated.
- A. Kamburov and L. Ivanov. Bowles Ridge and Central Tangra Mountains: Livingston Island, Antarctica. Scale 1:25000 map. Sofia: Manfred Wörner Foundation, 2023. ISBN 978-619-90008-6-1
