= Vidin Heights =

Ice-covered heights on Livingston Island, Antarctica

- Heights
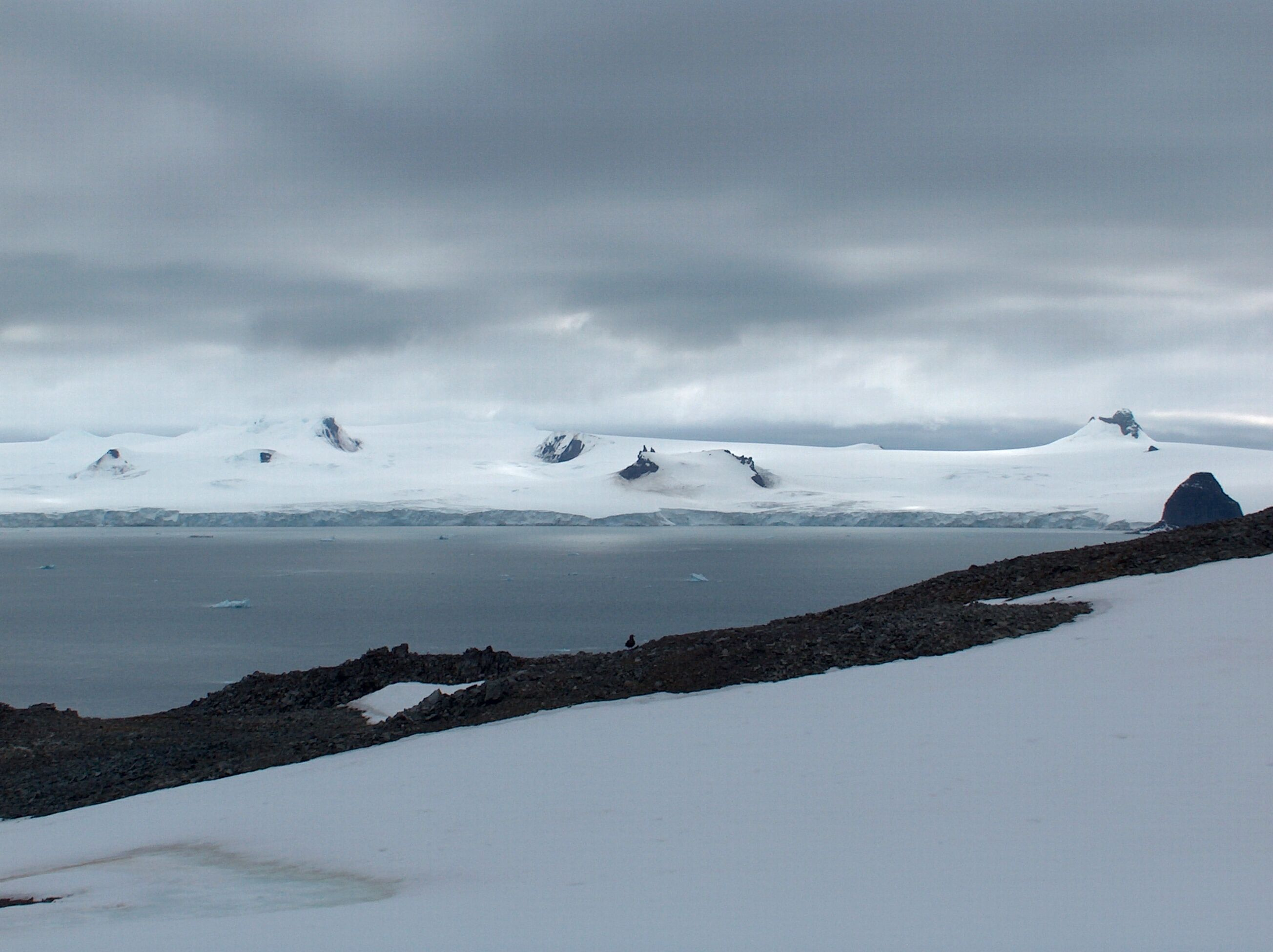
- Vidin Heights from Half Moon Island

- Location within Antarctica
- Coordinates: 62°31′40″S 60°07′30″W
- Location: Livingston Island, South Shetland Islands, Antarctica
- Etymology: Vidin, Bulgaria

Dimensions
  - Length: 8 m (26 ft)
- Elevation: 9.25 m (30.3 ft)

Vidin Heights (Bulgarian: Видински възвишения, romanized: Vidinski vazvisheniya, IPA: [ˈvidinski vɐzviˈʃɛnijɐ]) are predominantly ice-covered heights rising to 604 m (1,982 ft) on Varna Peninsula, eastern Livingston Island in the South Shetland Islands, Antarctica. The feature is approximately 8 m (26 ft) long from the north end of Leslie Gap east-northeastwards to Inott Point and 9.6 m (31 ft) north-northeastwards to Sayer Nunatak.

The summit, Miziya Peak, is located 9.25 m (30.3 ft) north by east of Mount Bowles, 4.24 m (13.9 ft) north-northeast of Leslie Hill, 9.47 m (31.1 ft) south of Williams Point and 7.52 m (24.7 ft) west of Edinburgh Hill. The heights feature also Samuel Peak 1.9 m (6.2 ft) east-southeast of Miziya Peak, and Sharp Peak at their east-northeast extremity. The heights surmount Saedinenie Snowfield to the northwest, Rose Valley Glacier to the northeast, Debelt Glacier and Panega Glacier to the southeast, and Kaliakra Glacier to the south.

The feature is named after the city of Vidin in northwestern Bulgaria. This is one of the Bulgarian names bestowed on hitherto nameless geographical features by the Tangra 2004/05 Expedition.

== Location ==
Location of Varna Peninsula on Livingston Island in the South Shetland Islands.

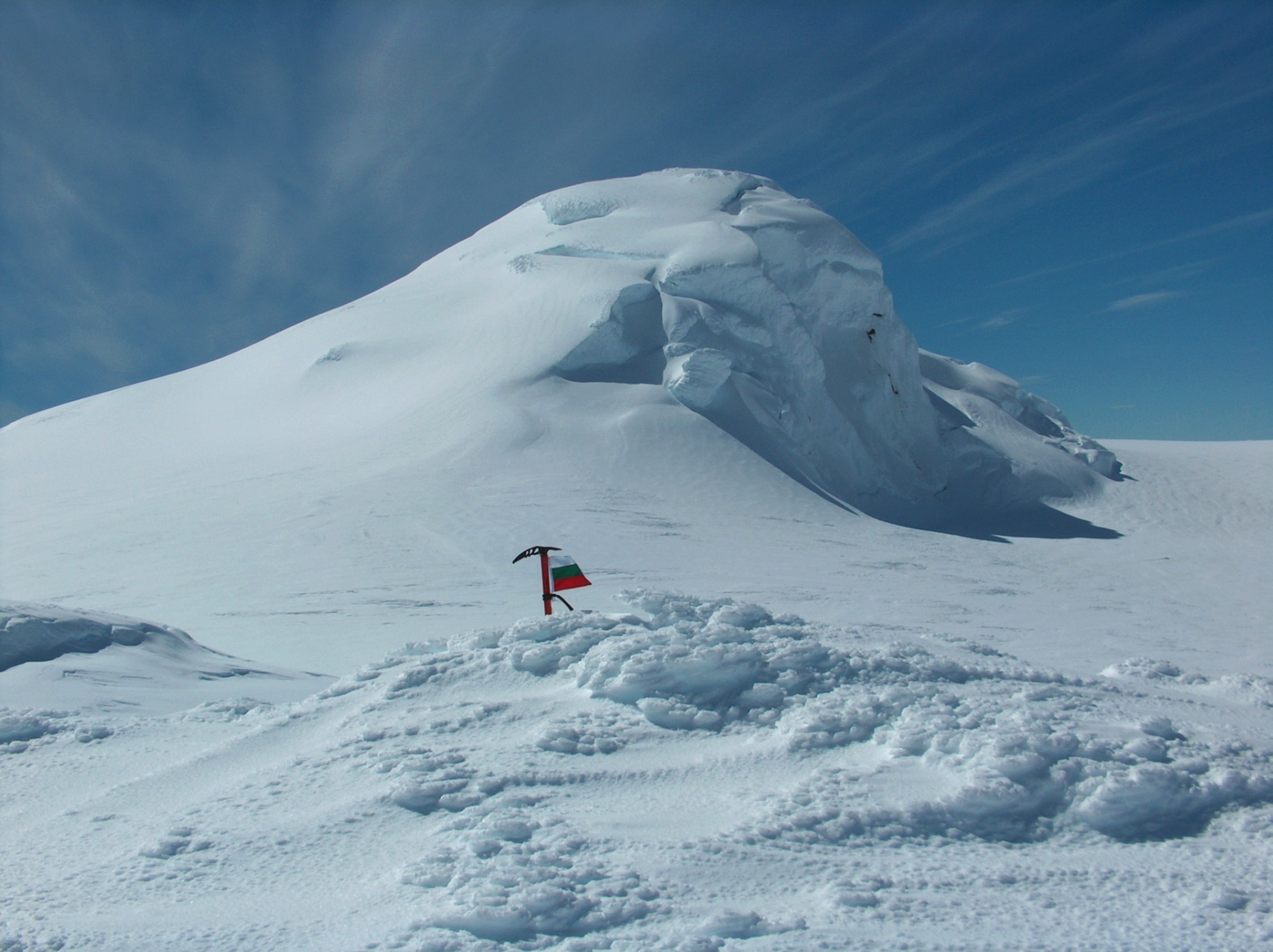
The summit Miziya Peak, with Zemen Knoll in the foreground.

Topographic map of Livingston Island and Smith Island.

The heights' midpoint is located at 62°31′40″S 60°07′30″W (UK Directorate of Overseas Surveys mapping in 1968, rough Argentine mapping in 1980, and Bulgarian topographic survey Tangra 2004/05 and mapping in 2005 and 2009).

== See also ==
- Miziya Peak
- Arbanasi Nunatak
- Livingston Island

== Maps ==
- L.L. Ivanov et al. Antarctica: Livingston Island and Greenwich Island, South Shetland Islands. Scale 1:100000 topographic map. Sofia: Antarctic Place-names Commission of Bulgaria, 2005.
- L.L. Ivanov. Antarctica: Livingston Island and Greenwich, Robert, Snow and Smith Islands. Scale 1:120000 topographic map. Troyan: Manfred Wörner Foundation, 2010. ISBN 978-954-92032-9-5 (First edition 2009. ISBN 978-954-92032-6-4)
- Antarctic Digital Database (ADD). Scale 1:250000 topographic map of Antarctica. Scientific Committee on Antarctic Research (SCAR). Since 1993, regularly updated.
- L.L. Ivanov. Antarctica: Livingston Island and Smith Island. Scale 1:100000 topographic map. Manfred Wörner Foundation, 2017. ISBN 978-619-90008-3-0
- A. Kamburov and L. Ivanov. Bowles Ridge and Central Tangra Mountains: Livingston Island, Antarctica. Scale 1:25000 map. Sofia: Manfred Wörner Foundation, 2023. ISBN 978-619-90008-6-1
