= Edinburgh Hill =

Location of Varna Peninsula on Livingston Island in the South Shetland Islands.

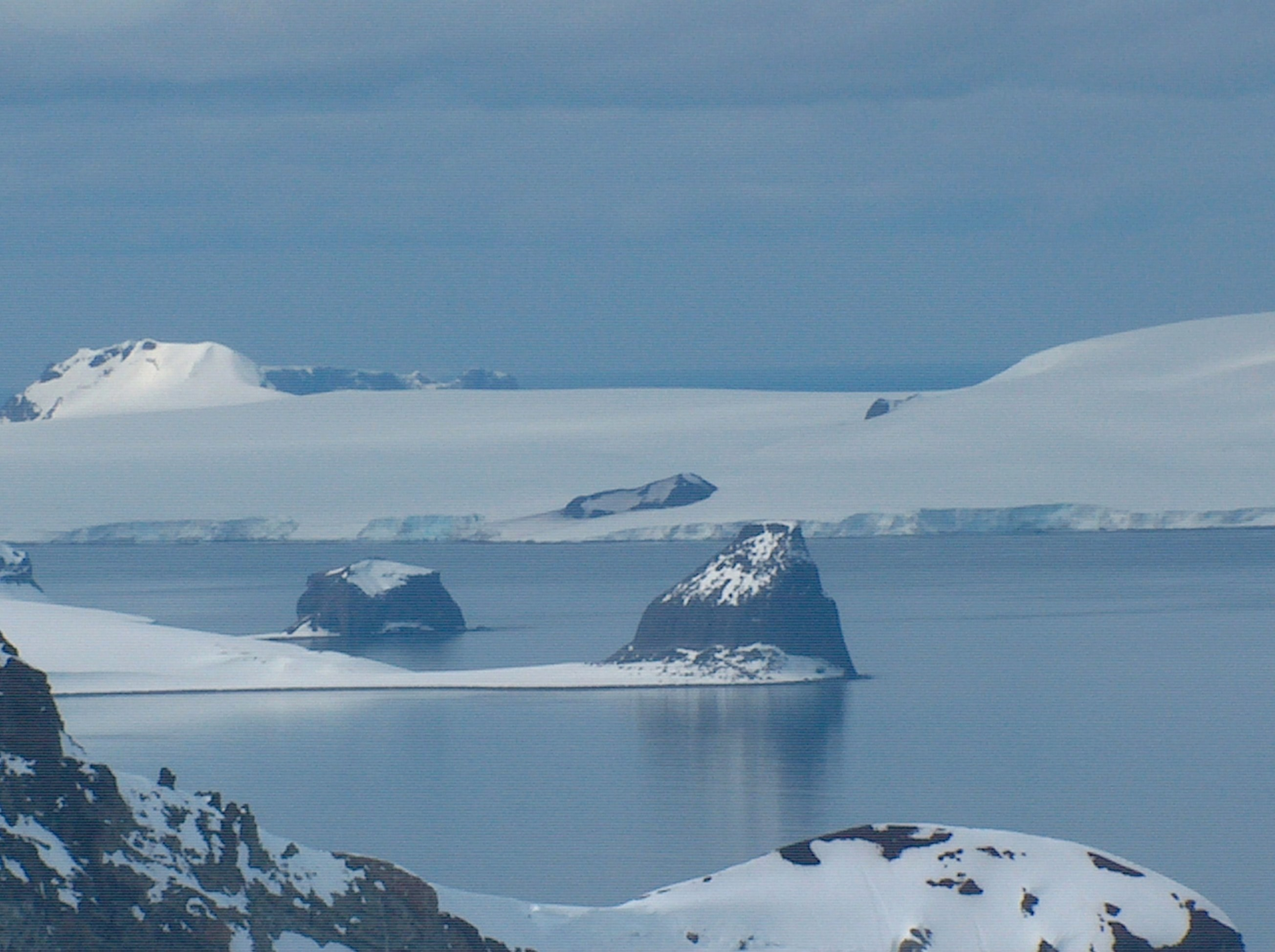
Edinburgh Hill from Lozen Nunatak, with Inott Point on the left, Zlatograd Rock in the foreground and Greenwich Island in the background.

Topographic map of Livingston Island and Smith Islands.

Edinburgh Hill is a narrow point projecting 650 m from the east coast of Varna Peninsula, Livingston Island in the South Shetland Islands, Antarctica into McFarlane Strait and ending up in a conspicuous rocky hill of elevation 180 m whose bottom half is composed of basalt columns. The point forms the northwest side of the entrance to Moon Bay. The area was visited by early 19th century sealers.

The feature is named after the city of Edinburgh, Scotland.

== Location ==
The point is located at 62°32′33″S 60°01′01″W which is 13.15 km northwest of Renier Point, 7.52 km east of Miziya Peak, 2 km south-southwest of Inott Point, and 7 km southwest of Yovkov Point, Greenwich Island. British mapping in 1968, Spanish in 1991, and Bulgarian in 2005 and 2009.

== Maps ==
- L.L. Ivanov et al. Antarctica: Livingston Island and Greenwich Island, South Shetland Islands. Scale 1:100000 topographic map. Sofia: Antarctic Place-names Commission of Bulgaria, 2005.
- L.L. Ivanov. Antarctica: Livingston Island and Greenwich, Robert, Snow and Smith Islands. Scale 1:120000 topographic map. Troyan: Manfred Wörner Foundation, 2009. ISBN 978-954-92032-6-4
- A. Kamburov and L. Ivanov. Bowles Ridge and Central Tangra Mountains: Livingston Island, Antarctica. Scale 1:25000 map. Sofia: Manfred Wörner Foundation, 2023. ISBN 978-619-90008-6-1
