= Fractional Calculus and Applied Analysis =

- Discipline: Mathematics
- Language: English
- Edited by: Virginia Kiryakova

Publication details
- History: 1998–present
- Publisher: Springer
- Frequency: Quarterly

Standard abbreviations
- ISO 4: Fract. Calc. Appl. Anal.

Indexing
- ISSN: 1311-0454 (print); 1314-2224 (web)
- OCLC no.: 830989737

Links
- Journal homepage; Online access; Online archive; Journal page at publisher's website

Fractional Calculus and Applied Analysis is a peer-reviewed mathematics journal published by Springer (previously by De Gruyter. It covers research on fractional calculus, special functions, integral transforms, and some closely related areas of applied analysis.

The journal is abstracted and indexed in Science Citation Index (since 2011), Scopus (since 2011), Clarivate Analytics (since 2011), Zentralblatt MATH, and Mathematical Reviews. It was founded in 1998, with the support of the Institute of Mathematics and Informatics at the Bulgarian Academy of Sciences, following a discussion among mathematicians and scientists attending the 2nd International Workshop “Transform Methods and Special Functions” (TMSF) in Varna, Bulgaria, in 1996. The journal has passed between several publishers: firstly the Institute of Mathematics and Informatics from 1998 to 2010, then Versita (acquired by De Gruyter in 2012) and Springer from 2011 to 2014, then De Gruyter from 2015 to 2011, then Springer from 2022 onwards.

The editor-in-chief of the journal is Virginia Kiryakova, a professor at the Institute of Mathematics and Informatics of the Bulgarian Academy of Sciences. The journal's Founding Editors included Eric Love, Ian Sneddon, Bogoljub Stanković, Rudolf Gorenflo, Danuta Przeworska-Rolewicz, Gary Roach, Anatoly Kilbas, and Wen Chen. Current editorial board members include Teodor Atanackovic, Serena Dipierro, Arran Fernandez, Małgorzata Klimek, Ralf Metzler, Yuliya Mishura, Juan José Nieto Roig, and Yuri Luchko among the associate editors.
