= Worner =

Worner (or Wörner) may refer to:

== People ==
- Anita Wörner (1942), German runner and Olympic competitor
- Anna Wörner (born 1989), German freestyle skier
- Bert Worner (1929–2012), Australian rules footballer
- Dominik Wörner (born 1970), German classical bass singer
- Elfie Wörner (1941–2006), German journalist and humanitarian; spouse of Manfred Wörner
- George Worner (1855–1950), American politician
- Johann-Dietrich Wörner (born 1954), German administrator (ESA; GAC), civil engineer, and professor
- Manfred Wörner (1934–1994), German politician and diplomat, defense minister, Secretary General of NATO; spouse of Elfie Wörner
- Marysole Wörner Baz (1936–2014), Mexican painter and sculptor
- Natalia Wörner (born 1967), German actress
- Ross Worner (born 1989), English professional footballer who plays as goalkeeper
- Ruby K. Worner (1900–1955), American chemist
- Tim Worner (born ?), Australian businessman

== Places ==
- Wörner (Alps), a mountain in the Karwendel on the border between Bavaria and Tyrol
- Wörner Gap, in eastern Livingston Island in the South Shetland Islands, Antarctica

== Other ==
- Manfred Wörner Foundation, a Bulgarian not-for-profit non-governmental organization

== See also ==
- Woerner, a surname
