= Lyubomir Ivanov (explorer) =

Bulgarian explorer

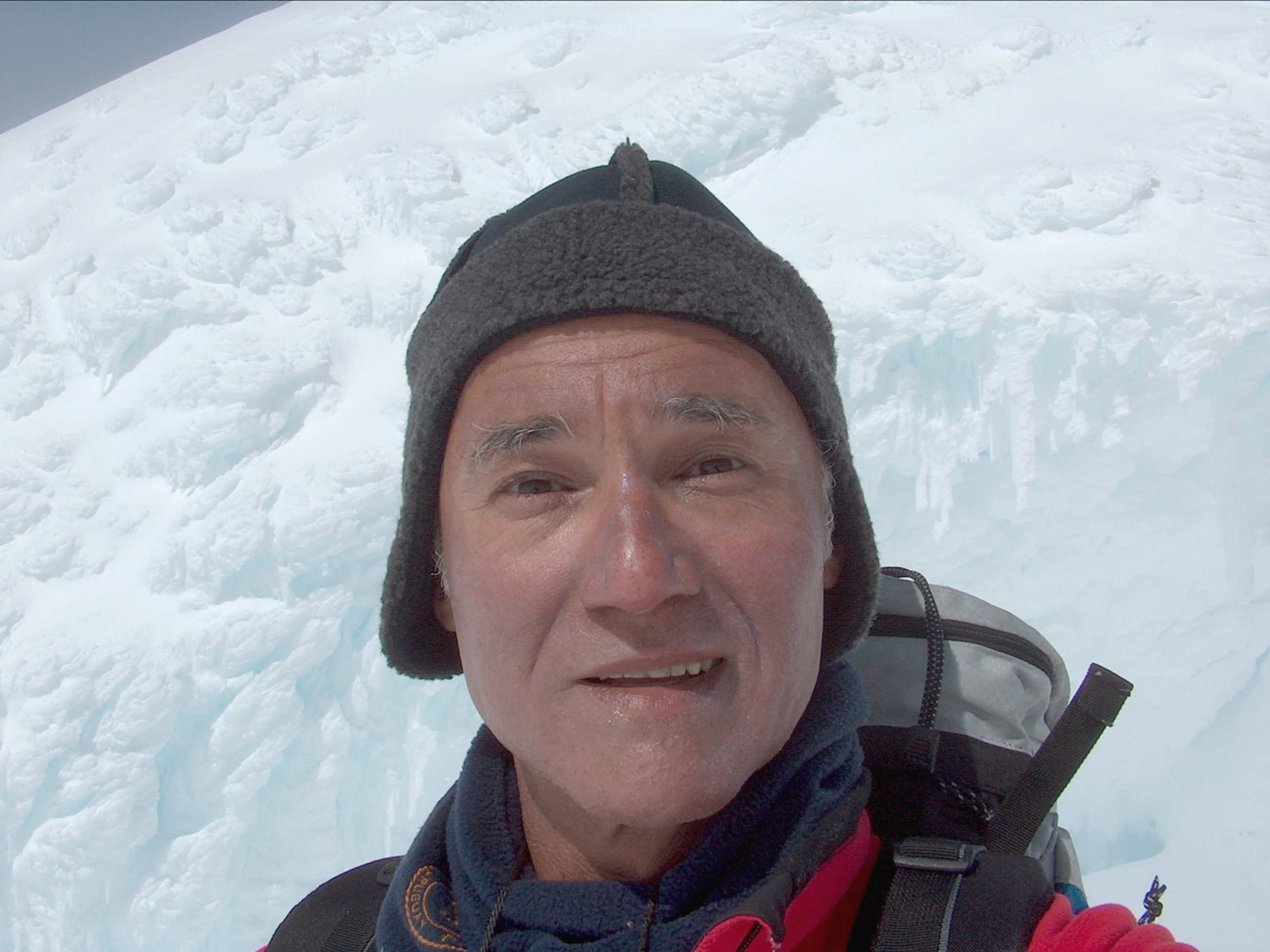
Self-portrait, 2004

Lyubomir Ivanov (Bulgarian: Любомир Иванов, born 7 October 1952 in Sofia) is a Bulgarian scientist, non-governmental activist, and Antarctic explorer. He is a graduate of the St. Kliment Ohridski University of Sofia with M.S. degree in mathematics in 1977. He earned his PhD from Sofia University in 1980, under the direction of Dimiter Skordev with a dissertation titled Iterative Operative Spaces, and was the 1987 winner of Acad. Nikola Obreshkov Prize, the highest Bulgarian award in mathematics.

== Academic and NGO work ==
Appointed head of the Department of Mathematical Logic at the Institute of Mathematics and Informatics, Bulgarian Academy of Sciences in 1990, Ivanov has since helped found the Atlantic Club of Bulgaria, in which he held the position of chairman from 2001 to 2009. In 1994, he founded the Manfred Wörner Foundation, an organisation dedicated to trans-atlantic co-operation. He was a member of the Streit Council Advisory Board, Washington, DC since 2006 and, founding Chairman, Antarctic Place-names Commission since 1994. He authored the modern Bulgarian system for Romanization of Cyrillic alphabet, adopted also for official use both by UN, and also by the US and UK.

In the course of his work for, among others, the Atlantic Club of Bulgaria, Ivanov has given interviews to various news outlets, at times espousing views that NATO must expand eastwards due to a deficit in its military capacity.

== Political career ==
Ivanov was a member of the UDF Coordinating Council and took part in the 1990 Bulgarian Round Table Talks. He served as a Member of Parliament in Bulgaria (1990–1991), acting as Chairman of the Green Party parliamentary group, and co-authored the current Constitution of Bulgaria. He has also served as parliamentary secretary for the Bulgarian ministry of foreign affairs.

== Antarctic expeditions ==
Ivanov has taken part in several Antarctic expeditions. In 2004, Ivanov went with Doychin Vasilev on the Tangra 2004/05 topographic expedition, noted by Discovery Channel, the Natural History Museum, the Royal Collection and the British Antarctic Survey as a timeline event in Antarctic exploration. Awarded the jubilee medal 30th Bulgarian Antarctic Expedition by the Bulgarian Antarctic Institute for his active participation in the expeditions and in the building of St. Kliment Ohridski polar base. He took part, inter alia, in the first Bulgarian landing on Smith Island in 2025.

== See also ==
- Tangra 2004/05
- Ivanov Beach

== Principal publications ==
- Ivanov, L.L. Algebraic Recursion Theory. Chichester, West Sussex: Ellis Horwood; and New York: John Wiley & Sons, 1986. 256 pp. ISBN 978-0-13-026907-2; ISBN 978-0-7458-0102-5
- Ivanov, L. Winter Olympics. The Times (London, England), 15 October 1986. p. 17. Issue 62589. ISSN 0140-0460
- Ivanov, L.L. wikisource:Charter '89 for Preservation of the Bulgarian Nature Heritage. Independent Society of Ecoglasnost, Club for Glasnost and Restructuring, and Wilderness Fund Bulgaria. Sofia, 1989.
- Ivanov, L. and M. Milouchev. Draft parliamentary decision for the full EU (EC) membership of Bulgaria. Sofia, 1990. (in Bulgarian; English translation)
- Ivanov, L.L. wikisource:Toponymic Guidelines for Antarctica. Antarctic Place-names Commission of Bulgaria. Sofia, 1995.
- Ivanov, L.L. St. Kliment Ohridski Base, Livingston Island. 1:1000 scale topographic map. Antarctic Place-names Commission of Bulgaria. Project supported by the Atlantic Club of Bulgaria and the Bulgarian Antarctic Institute. Sofia, 1996. (in Bulgarian)
- Ivanov, L.L. Skordev's contribution to Recursion theory. Annual of Sofia University, Faculty of Mathematics and Informatics, 90 (1998), 9–15.
- Popov, S. et al. NATO's Global Mission in the 21st century. 1998–99 NATO Manfred Wörner Fellowship. Sofia: Atlantic Club of Bulgaria, 2000. 123 pp.
- Ivanov, L.L. Platek Spaces. Fundamenta Informaticae. 44 (2000). 145–181. ISSN 0169-2968
- Ivanov, L.L. Boldface recursion on Platek Spaces. Fundamenta Informaticae. 44 (2000). 183–208. ISSN 0169-2968
- Ivanov, L.L. On the Romanization of Bulgarian and English. Contrastive Linguistics, XXVIII, 2003, 2, pp. 109–118. ISSN 0204-8701; Errata, id., XXIX, 2004, 1, p. 157.
- Ivanov, L. and N. Glavinchev, R. Tosheva and S. Naydenov. Antarctica: Livingston Island and Greenwich Island, South Shetland Islands (from English Strait to Morton Strait, with illustrations and ice-cover distribution). 1:100000 scale topographic map. Antarctic Place-names Commission of Bulgaria. Sofia, 2005.
- Ivanov, L.L. The role of immigration for the demographic and national development of Bulgaria in the 21st century, in: Towards New Immigration Policies for Bulgaria. Sofia: Manfred Wörner Foundation, 2006. 54 pp. (in Bulgarian, English summary) ISBN 978-954-92032-1-9
- Ivanov, L. A Wider Atlantic: Further integration of the Wider Middle East and Russia in the framework of Euro-Atlantic Structures. Freedom & Union Vol. I, No. 2, Summer 2006. pp. 16–18.
- Ivanov, L. et al.. Sofia: Multiprint Ltd., 2007. 40 pp. ISBN 978-954-90437-8-5
- Ivanov, L. and V. Yule.. Contrastive Linguistics. XXXII, 2007, 2. pp. 50–64. ISSN 0204-8701
- Ivanov, L. et al. Bulgarian Policies on the Republic of Macedonia: Recommendations on the development of good neighbourly relations following Bulgaria’s accession to the EU and in the context of NATO and EU enlargement in the Western Balkans. Sofia: Manfred Wörner Foundation, 2008. 80 pp. (Trilingual publication in Bulgarian, Macedonian and English) ISBN 978-954-92032-2-6
- Ivanov, L.L. There Is Simply No Way of Joining Those Clubs Other Than by Accepting Their Rules, in: Changing Balkans: Macedonia on the Road to NATO and EU. 11th International Conference, 20–21 February 2009, Ohrid. Sofia: Balkan Political Club Foundation, 2009. ISBN 978-954-91623-7-0
- Ivanov, L.L. Antarctica: Livingston Island and Greenwich, Robert, Snow and Smith Islands. Scale 1:120000 topographic map. Troyan: Manfred Wörner Foundation, 2010. ISBN 978-954-92032-9-5 (First edition 2009. ISBN 978-954-92032-6-4)
- Ivanov, L.L. Bulgaria in Antarctica. South Shetland Islands. Sofia: Manfred Wörner Foundation, 2009. 16 pp., with a folded map. ISBN 978-954-92032-7-1
- Ivanov, L.L. Falklands and Crimea the new cold war. Penguin News Falkland Islands, Vol. 25 No. 46, 2 May 2014. p. 7.
- Ivanov, L. and N. Ivanova. Antarctic: Nature, History, Utilization, Geographic Names and Bulgarian Participation. Sofia: Manfred Wörner Foundation, 2014. 368 pp. (in Bulgarian) ISBN 978-619-90008-1-6 (Second revised and updated edition, 2014. 411 pp. ISBN 978-619-90008-2-3)
- Ivanov, L. General Geography and History of Livingston Island. In: Bulgarian Antarctic Research: A Synthesis. Eds. C. Pimpirev and N. Chipev. Sofia: St. Kliment Ohridski University Press, 2015. pp. 17–28. ISBN 978-954-07-3939-7
- Ivanov, L. Antarctica: Livingston Island and Smith Island. Scale 1:100000 topographic map. Manfred Wörner Foundation, 2017. ISBN 978-619-90008-3-0
- Ivanov, L. Streamlined Romanization of Russian Cyrillic. Contrastive Linguistics. XLII (2017) No. 2. pp. 66–73. ISSN 0204-8701
- Ivanov, L. Demographic priorities and goals of the Government Program 2017–2021. Presentation at the round table Demographic Policies and Labour Mobility organized by the Ministry of Labour and Social Policy, and the State Agency for the Bulgarians Abroad. Sofia, 19 September 2017. 4 pp. (in Bulgarian and English)
- Ivanov, L. Measures to solve demographic problems. Business Club Magazine. Issue 11, 2017. pp. 18–20. ISSN 2367-623X (in Bulgarian and English)
- Ivanov, L. Bulgarian Names in Antarctica. Sofia: Manfred Wörner Foundation, 2019. 526 pp. ISBN 978-619-90008-4-7 (in Bulgarian) (Second revised and updated edition, 2021. 539 pp. ISBN 978-619-90008-5-4)
- Ivanov, L. History of Bulgarian Polar Research – 30 Years of Bulgarian Antarctic Expeditions (in Bulgarian). Bulgarian Polar Journal, 2021 No. 1, pp. 2–7. (English version)
- Ivanov, L.L. Kissinger’s Plan for Ukraine Revised. In: Russia-Ukraine War: Consequences for the World. Ed. V.V. Marenichenko. Proceedings of the International Scientific and Practical Internet Conference, Dnipro, Ukraine, 28–29 April 2022. pp. 34–36. ISBN 978-617-95229-3-2 (illustrated) (Bulgarian version)
- Ivanov, L. and N. Ivanova. The World of Antarctica. Generis Publishing, 2022. 241 pp. ISBN 979-8-88676-403-1
- Kamburov A. and L. Ivanov. Bowles Ridge and Central Tangra Mountains: Livingston Island, Antarctica. Scale 1:25000 map. Sofia: Manfred Wörner Foundation, 2023. ISBN 978-619-90008-6-1
- Ivanov, L. Antarctic place names. LIK Magazine. June 2023. pp. 89–96. (in Bulgarian) ISSN 0324-0444
- Ivanov, L. The Bulgarian Antarctic Base St. Kliment Ohridski on Livingston Island, Antarctica. In: eds. B. Kolev, G. Zhelezov et al. National Geographic Space of Bulgaria. Geography of Bulgaria, volume 1. Sofia: Publishing House of the Bulgarian Academy of Sciences, 2025. pp. 19-20. ISBN 978-619-245-530-9 (in Bulgarian)
- Ivanov, L. The Bulgarian Antarctic Base St. Kliment Ohridski on Livingston Island, Antarctica. In: eds. B. Kolev, G. Zhelezov et al. National Geographic Space of Bulgaria. Geography of Bulgaria, volume 2. Sofia: Publishing House of the Bulgarian Academy of Sciences, 2025. pp. 24-25, 28. ISBN 978-619-245-539-2 (in Bulgarian)
