= Department of Mathematical Logic (Bulgarian Academy of Sciences) =

The Department of Mathematical Logic at the Bulgarian Academy of Sciences was created by the Institute of Mathematics and Informatics in implementation of Government Decree N0. 236 of November 3, 1959.

Its first chairman was Boyan Petkanchin (1907–87) who worked to promote and disseminate the knowledge of mathematical logic both in the professional mathematical community in Bulgaria and as popular science.

Vladimir Sotirov and Radoslav Pavlov joined the department in 1970, followed by George Gargov, Anatoly Buda, Lyubomir Ivanov, Slavyan Radev and Solomon Passy in 1976-89. In 1996-2000 the department was joined by Dimiter Dobrev, Jordan Zashev and Dimitar Guelev.

From 1971 to 1989 the department was merged with the corresponding division of the Faculty of Mathematics and Informatics at Sofia University, with Dimiter Skordev heading the integrated structure since 1971. In 1989 the institutional relationship with Sofia University was severed, and the department resumed as a division of the Institute of Mathematics and Informatics, headed since then by Lyubomir Ivanov.

The logicians Bogdan Dyankov, Hristo Smolenov, Veselin Petrov and Marion Mircheva stayed with the department for various periods of time, all of them coming from the Institute of Philosophy at the Bulgarian Academy of Sciences once the latter was dissolved on account of the dissident activities of its members in 1989.

The research of the department is mostly in the area of algebraic recursion theory, modal, temporal and other non-classical logics, as well as logic programming including the development of a version of the Prolog programming language. The department developed also the Streamlined System adopted as the official national system for the Romanization of Bulgarian, and eventually codified by the Bulgarian Law of Transliteration in 2009. A joint multi-institutional project led by the department has contributed to the development and introduction of a new Bulgarian phonetic keyboard layout for personal computers and mobile phones.

Besides their research activities, members of the department have an extensive lecturing practice at various faculties of Sofia University as well as other Bulgarian universities. Some members of the department have earned public recognition for their non-academic activities. Sotirov, Ivanov, and Passy were returned MPs in the VII Grand National Assembly on the side of the Union of Democratic Forces, and co-authored the new Bulgarian Constitution.

In 2011 the departments of Mathematical Logic and Algebra were merged to form the Department of Algebra and Logic at the Institute of Mathematics and Informatics, Bulgarian Academy of Sciences.
