= Luchko =

Luchko (Ukrainian: Лучко) is a gender-neutral Ukrainian surname. Notable people with the surname include:

- Klara Luchko (1925–2005), Soviet actress
- Yuri Luchko, German mathematician
