= Atlantic Club =

Atlantic Club may refer to:

- Atlantic Club of Bulgaria, Bulgarian think tank
- Atlantic Club Casino Hotel, former casino resort in Atlantic City, New Jersey
- Atlantic Club Ridge, landform in Antarctica
