= Rosana Rodríguez-López =

Spanish mathematician

Rosana Rodríguez-López is a Spanish mathematician known for her well-cited research publications applying fixed-point theorems to differential equations. She is a professor in the Department of Statistics, Mathematical Analysis and Optimisation at the University of Santiago de Compostela, where she obtained her Ph.D. in 2005 with the doctoral thesis "Periodic solutions for nonlinear differential equations" under the supervision of Juan José Nieto Roig.

== Career ==
As a member of the former Department of Mathematical Analysis and current Department of Statistics, Mathematical Analysis and Optimization, Rodríguez-López is a research professor and vice dean of the Faculty of Mathematics and coordinator of the degree in Mathematics. She previously enjoyed a Training Grant for Research Personnel (FPI) and was a teacher in secondary schools.

Her research fields are differential equations and fuzzy mathematics.

She obtained recognition from the mathematical community in 2005, when she published the article “Contractive Mapping Theorems in Partially Ordered Sets and Applications to Ordinary Differential Equations” in Order magazine, together with Juan José Nieto. This work is one of the most cited in the mathematical academic field of Spanish origin. Since then she has authored nearly seventy works of mathematical analysis.

== Selected works ==
- Nieto, Juan José; Rodriguez Lopez, Rose. "Some Considerations on Functional Differential Equations of Advanced Type. Mathematical Reviews", 0025-584X, Vol. 283, No. 10, 2010, pp. 10-1 1439-1
- Nieto, Juan José; Rodríguez López, Rosana. "Upper and lower solutions method for fuzzy differential equations". SeMA Journal: Bulletin of the Spanish Society of Applied Mathematics, 1575-9822, Nº. 51, 2010, pp. 125-132
- Nieto, Juan José; Rodríguez López, Rosana. "Applications of contractive-like mapping principles to fuzzy equations". Complutense Mathematical Magazine, 1139-1138, Vol. 19, No. 2, 2006, pp. 361-383
- Nieto, Juan José; Rodríguez López, Rosana. "Contractive mapping theorems in partially ordered sets and applications to ordinary differential equations". Order, 2005. 22: 223–239.
- Doctoral thesis “Periodic solutions for nonlinear differential equations”, 2005.
