= Manfred-Wörner-Seminar =

Security policy conference

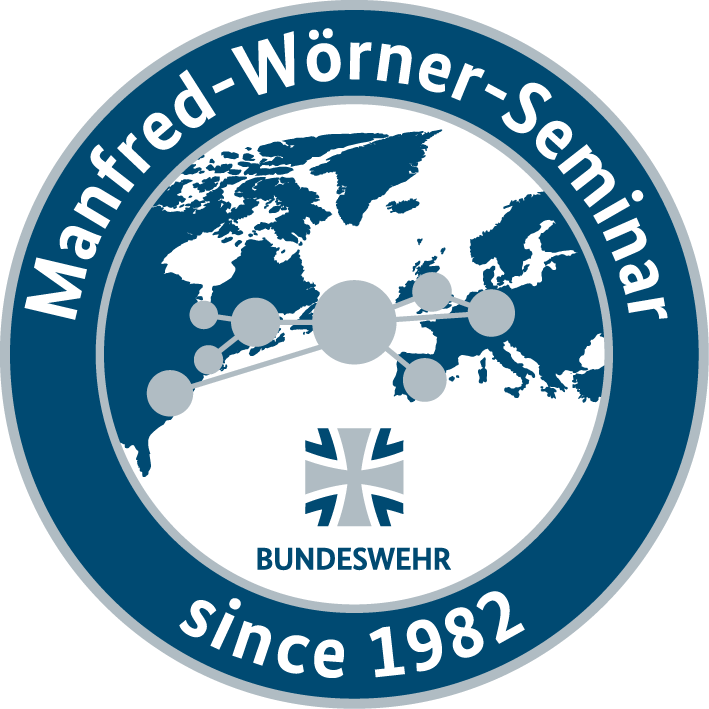
Logo (since 2023)

The Manfred Wörner Seminar is an international conference of young leaders in the foreign and security policy sector organized twice a year by the German Federal Ministry of Defense. For each edition, 10 selected participants from Germany, the United States and other European countries, respectively, meet to discuss current world policy issues, visit relevant institutions in several European countries, exchange ideas with high-ranking leaders there and strengthen transatlantic cooperation.

The seminar was first held in 1982 as the Seminar for German-American Understanding and is named after former German Defense Minister and NATO Secretary General Manfred Wörner.

== Program ==
During the twelve-day program, which will run for nine days until 2021, the participants usually visit various international institutions, authorities, ministries and military bases. These regularly include NATO headquarters, the European Commission, the European External Action Service, the German Ministry of Defense, the German Chancellery, the German Foreign Office and the German Parliament. Visited military bases are mostly the NATO Airborne Early Warning & Control Force Command in Geilenkirchen and the Allied Joint Force Command Brunssum.

All visits take the form of expert discussions with representatives of the respective institutions on selected topics. In 2022, for example, an expert discussion was held with NATO spokesperson Oana Lungescu. In addition, further rounds of talks are held with experts who are independent of the institutions, for example professors or representatives of think tanks.

In addition to the security policy exchange with experts, another aspect of the seminar is the promotion of international understanding and networking among the participants. Through the alumni network, the goal of international networking is also pursued across cohorts. The connections established are intended to lay the foundation for a constant mutual dialogue across the Atlantic, which will sharpen understanding of the respective political conditions and interests and thus contribute to building mutual trust. The motto of the seminar is "Don't talk about each other, talk to each other". Due to the international composition of the participants, the seminar will be held in English.

== Participants ==
The seminar is aimed at young, civilian leaders from Germany, the US and European countries in the age range between 25 and 35 who have already gained initial experience as decision-makers in politics, business and academia. Most of them are members of ministries, authorities and state institutions as well as companies, organizations, think tanks, universities and colleges.

== History ==
Initiated by the then Federal Minister of Defense, Manfred Wörner, the seminar was launched in 1982 as the "Seminar for German-American Understanding." Wörner's intention was to use the seminar to contribute to understanding between the security policy cultures of Germany and its most important ally, the United States, which are similar in many areas but reveal different perspectives on the same challenges in others. Above all, security and defense policy issues played a central role from the outset.

After Manfred Wörner's death in 1994, the seminar was renamed the "Manfred Wörner Seminar for German-American Understanding" in 1995 in his honor by the then acting Federal Minister of Defense, Volker Rühe, in the presence of Wörner's widow, Elfie Wörner.

From 1982 to 1988, the Air Force Press Center was responsible for conducting the seminar on behalf of the Federal Ministry of Defense, and from 1989 to 2012, the Armed Forces Office, Public Relations Division in Sankt Augustin. In the course of the realignment of the Bundeswehr, the department responsible for seminar management moved in 2012 to the Bundeswehr Academy for Information and Communication in Strausberg, now the Bundeswehr Information Work Center. To this day, the Bundeswehr and Society division, which was reorganized after the move, is responsible for planning, organizing, conducting and supporting the Manfred Wörner Seminar there.

Until 2019, 30 young German and American leaders from the fields of business, science and politics met annually per seminar for a dialogue on the opportunities and challenges of German-American relations. In 2020, for the first time in its history, the seminar could not take place due to the global coronavirus pandemic.

The seminar for German-European groups of participants, which was held in parallel from 2010 under the name "Europe Seminar," was merged with the Manfred Wörner Seminar for the first time in 2021 and held under the title Euro-Atlantic Seminar. Originally intended to compensate for the cancellation of the Manfred Wörner Seminar and Europe Seminar in 2020, the format brought together participants from Germany, the United States, and various other European countries for the first time. From 2022, the combination of Manfred Wörner Seminar and Europe Seminar was retained, but will continue under the traditional brand name Manfred Wörner Seminar. In addition, two rounds have been held annually since then, usually between June and September, with a total of 30 young German, U.S. and European executives taking part in each.

== Seminar Thaler ==
Following the example of the Commander's Coin tradition, which is widespread in many armed forces, participants are presented with the Seminar Thaler at the end of each seminar, in addition to a certificate, the possession of which identifies them as alumni of the Manfred Woerner Seminar. Similar to the case of the logo, the design of the thaler has changed several times since the tradition was introduced. It shows the logo of the Seminary on the front. The seminar thaler was introduced at the beginning of the decade of the new millennium, after the tradition of the Commander's Coin had spread also in the German Armed Forces. In some cases, the coin is also awarded to speakers who have given presentations or engaged in discussions with the participants during the seminar. The coin is always presented by one of the participants.
