= Virginia Kiryakova =

Bulgarian mathematician

Virginia S. Kiryakova (née Virdzhinia Stoinova Hristova) is a Bulgarian mathematician known for her work on the fractional calculus, on special functions in fractional calculus including the Mittag-Leffler functions, and on the history of calculus. She is a professor in the Institute of Mathematics and Informatics of the Bulgarian Academy of Sciences.

== Education and career ==
As a high school student, Kiryakova competed for Bulgaria in the 1969 International Mathematical Olympiad, earning a bronze medal. She graduated from Sofia University in 1975 with a combined bachelor's and master's degree in mathematics, and in the same year became a researcher in the Institute of Mathematics and Informatics. She earned a Ph.D. in 1987, with the thesis Generalized Operators of Integration and Differentiation of Fractional Order and Applications, and completed a Dr.Sc. (habilitation) in 2010, with the thesis Generalized Fractional Calculus and Applications in Analysis, supervised by Ivan Dimovski.

She is editor-in-chief of the journals Fractional Calculus and Applied Analysis and International Journal of Applied Mathematics.

== Selected publications ==
Kiryakova is the author of the research monograph Generalized Fractional Calculus and Applications (1993). She has also coauthored highly cited work on the history of calculus.

== Recognition ==
Kiryakova won the 1996 Academic Prize for Mathematical Sciences of Bulgarian Academy of Sciences. In 2012, at the 5th Symposium on Fractional Differentiation and its Applications, she was given the FDA Dissemination Award, for her "dissemination of fractional calculus among the scientific community, industry and society" over the previous five years.
