= Atlantic Club of Bulgaria =

Bulgarian think tank

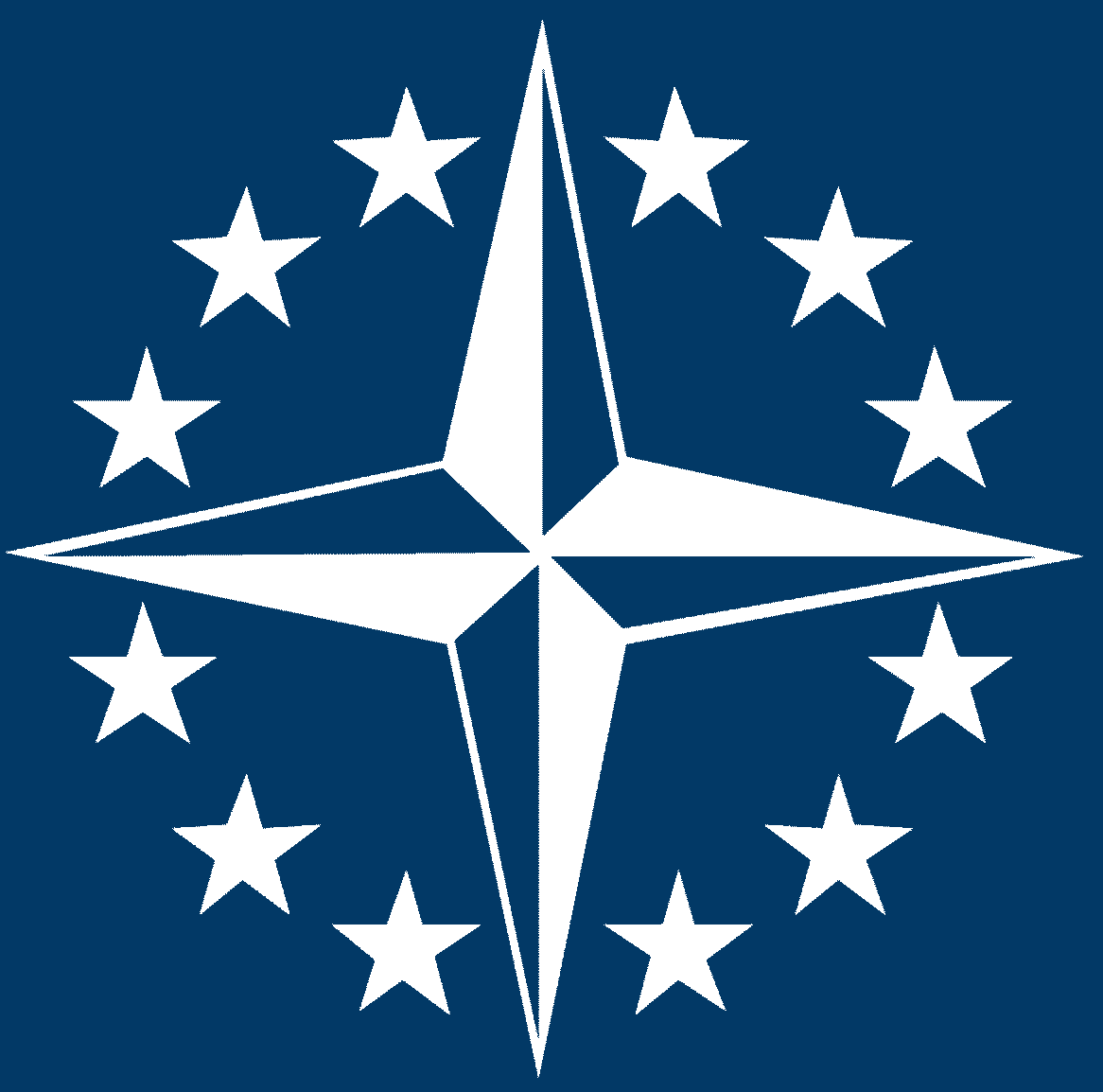
Club's logo

The Atlantic Club of Bulgaria is a non-governmental, non-partisan organization dedicated to fostering the common values of the Euro-Atlantic community.

== History ==
The Atlantic Club of Bulgaria was founded in 1990 around the pro-NATO lobby in the first post-Cold War Bulgarian Parliament. It was born when its founder, Solomon Passy, also the owner of a Trabant automobile, welcomed Manfred Wörner and gave him a tour of Sofia in a Trabant.

Officially established on 4 April 1991, the Atlantic Club has grown to include members from all walks of life: government, academia, military, business and media. The Atlantic Club was the first Atlantic NGO outside NATO, founded on Warsaw Pact territory, and the first non-NATO member (since 1992) of the Atlantic Treaty Association (ATA).

The Club raised the funds, and jointly with the Bulgarian Antarctic Institute, organized the resumption of Bulgaria's Antarctic activities in 1993, the upgrading of the Bulgarian refuge on Livingston Island and its redesignation as St. Kliment Ohridski Base, as well as the construction of a new main building of the base started during the 1995/96 season.

The Atlantic Club initiated a national committee that organized the visit of Pope John Paul II to Bulgaria in 2002, and also co-hosted the mass rally for U.S. President Bill Clinton who visited Sofia in 1999, and another one for US Secretary of State Colin Powell in 2003.

In 2004, Bulgaria joined NATO.

After attending the Nobel Prize Ceremony in Oslo in 2012, Solomon Passy suggested that the EU should nominate Bulgaria for the Nobel Peace Prize next year. In 2013, the Club underlined the 70th anniversary of the rescue of nearly 50,000 Jews from being sent to concentration camps in Nazi Germany when the government of Tsar Boris III planned deportation of the Jewish population but it was prevented by the Holy Synod, the Bulgarian Orthodox church and civil protests.

In September 2015, the ACB sent a delegation to the Fiji after the Asian country had established diplomatic ties with Bulgaria in March 2015.

In 2018, the ACB disputed the MIG-29 contracts signed between the Bulgarian government and the Russian Federation.

== About ==
The Atlantic Club of Bulgaria works to promote Bulgaria's integration with and role in the Atlantic Alliance, and all Euro-Atlantic political, security, economic and other structures. Within Bulgaria, the Atlantic Club serves the broader purpose of supporting democracy, human rights, free market economy and rule of law.

== Initiatives ==
The Club's activities focus primarily on raising public awareness about security and international affairs. The list of guest speakers includes the Nobel Peace Prize Laureates Lech Wałęsa, Shimon Peres, Mikhail Gorbachev and the 14th Dalai Lama of Tibet. A number of heads of states and governments have addressed the Club.

In its think-tank capacity, the Atlantic Club sponsors round tables, seminars and conferences on a wide variety of topics, and is a leading partner in the Security Sector Reform Coalition formed by Bulgarian NGOs to develop strategic reports on key policy issues in the field of foreign and security policy, and defense reform and modernization.

The Club assists in the establishment of Atlantic associations in other countries of Central and Eastern Europe, and more recently in Afghanistan, Iraq, and other Asian, African and South American countries.

The Atlantic Club is a co-founder of the Bulgarian Aerospace Agency, the Bulgarian Antarctic Institute and the Economic Policy Institute, Sofia.

== Organization ==
The Club's international board of directors includes prominent individuals from Bulgaria, Europe and North America working for Atlanticism or humanism in general. The organization has regional chapters in Burgas, Dospat and Sarnitsa, Gabrovo, Haskovo, Plovdiv, Ruse, Varna and Yambol, and is associated with the NATO Information Center in Sofia, the Bulgarian Euro-Atlantic Youth Club, and the Manfred Wörner Foundation.

The Founding President (1991–2001 and 2009-) and Honorary President of the Club (2001–2009) is Dr. Solomon Passy. Dr. Lyubomir Ivanov was the Chairman and CEO of the Atlantic Club in 2001-2009.

== Awards ==
- 1998 : Manfred Wörner Fellowship by NATO to develop a strategic study entitled NATO's Global Mission in the 21st Century.
- Golden Award for outstanding personal contribution to promoting Atlantic values, solidarity and cooperation.
- The President of Bulgaria has named a geographical feature in Antarctica for the Atlantic Club of Bulgaria, namely the Atlantic Club Ridge on Livingston Island.

== Publications ==
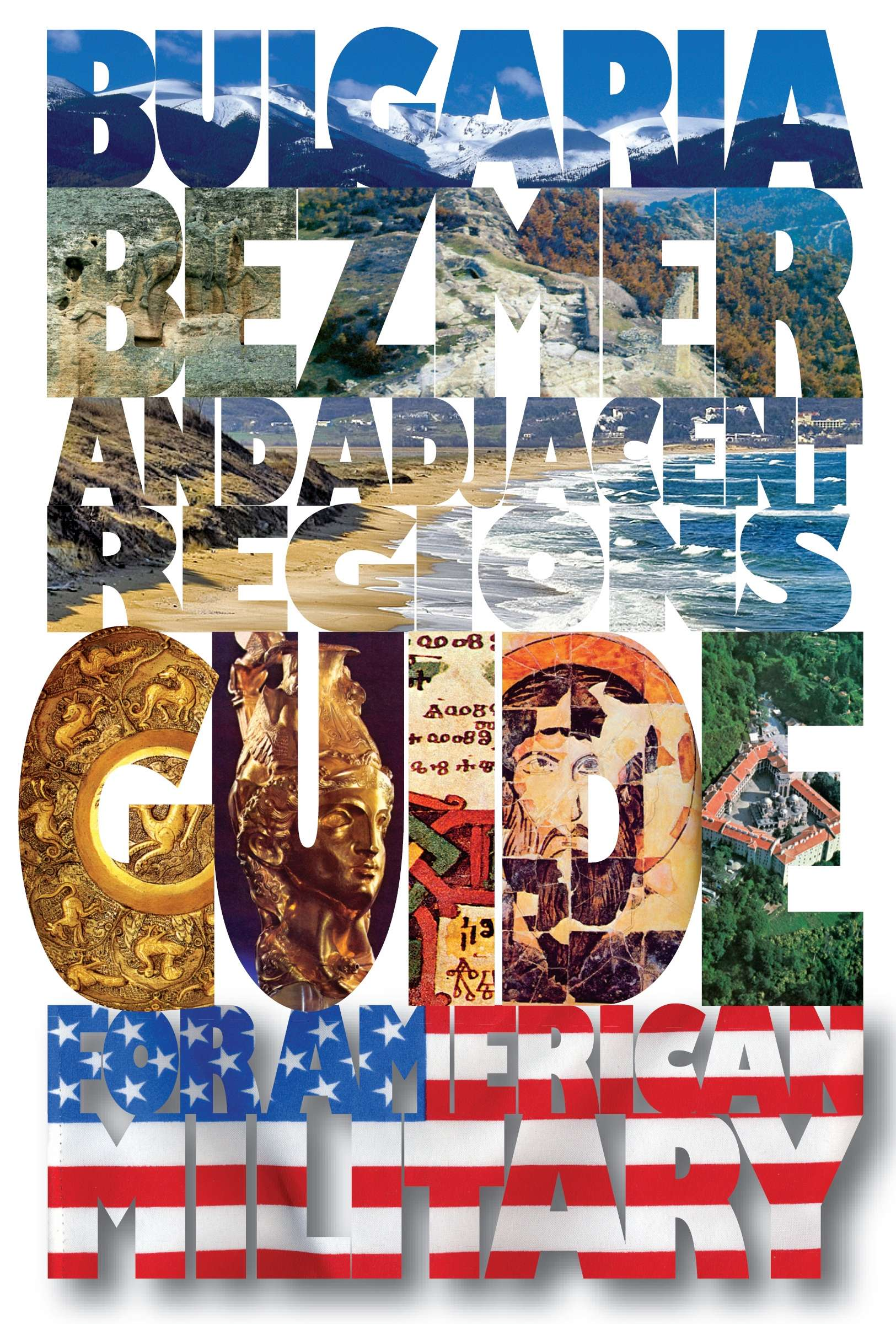
Bezmer Guide

- S. Popov et al., NATO's Global Mission in the 21st Century, Atlantic Club of Bulgaria, Sofia, 2000
- J. Bugajski and B. Tashev eds., Early warning and policy perspectives in the Trans-Atlantic security agenda: Central and East European point of view, NI Plus Publishing House, Sofia, 2005, ISBN 954-90437-7-0
- L. Ivanov and P. Pantev eds., The Joint Bulgarian-American Military Facilities: Public opinion and strategic, political, economic, and environmental aspects, NI Plus Publishing House, Sofia, 2006 (in Bulgarian)
- L. Ivanov ed., Bulgaria: Bezmer and adjacent regions — Guide for American military, Multiprint Ltd., Sofia, 2007, ISBN 978-954-90437-8-5

== See also ==
- Atlantic Treaty Association
- Manfred Wörner Foundation
