= Danuta Przeworska-Rolewicz =

Polish mathematician (1931–2012)

- Born: Danuta Przeworska; 25 May 1931; Warsaw, Poland
- Died: 23 June 2012 (aged 81); Warsaw, Poland
- Burial place: Powązki Military Cemetery
- Education: University of Warsaw; Polish Academy of Sciences
- Occupations: Mathematician, professor
- Awards: Stefan Banach Prize (1969)

Danuta Przeworska-Rolewicz (25 May 1931 – 23 June 2012), was a Polish professor of mathematics and long-time employee of the Institute of Mathematics of the Polish Academy of Sciences. During World War II, as a child, she was a resistance fighter.

== Life and work ==
Danuta Przeworska was born in Warsaw into the family of two archaeologists Stefan Przeworski and his wife Janina. Initially, Danuta wanted to pursue archaeology but switched to mathematics instead. With the outbreak of World War II, she participated in the resistance movement as a child and fought in the Warsaw Uprising of 1944, for which she was awarded the Warsaw Uprising Cross.

=== Academic work ===
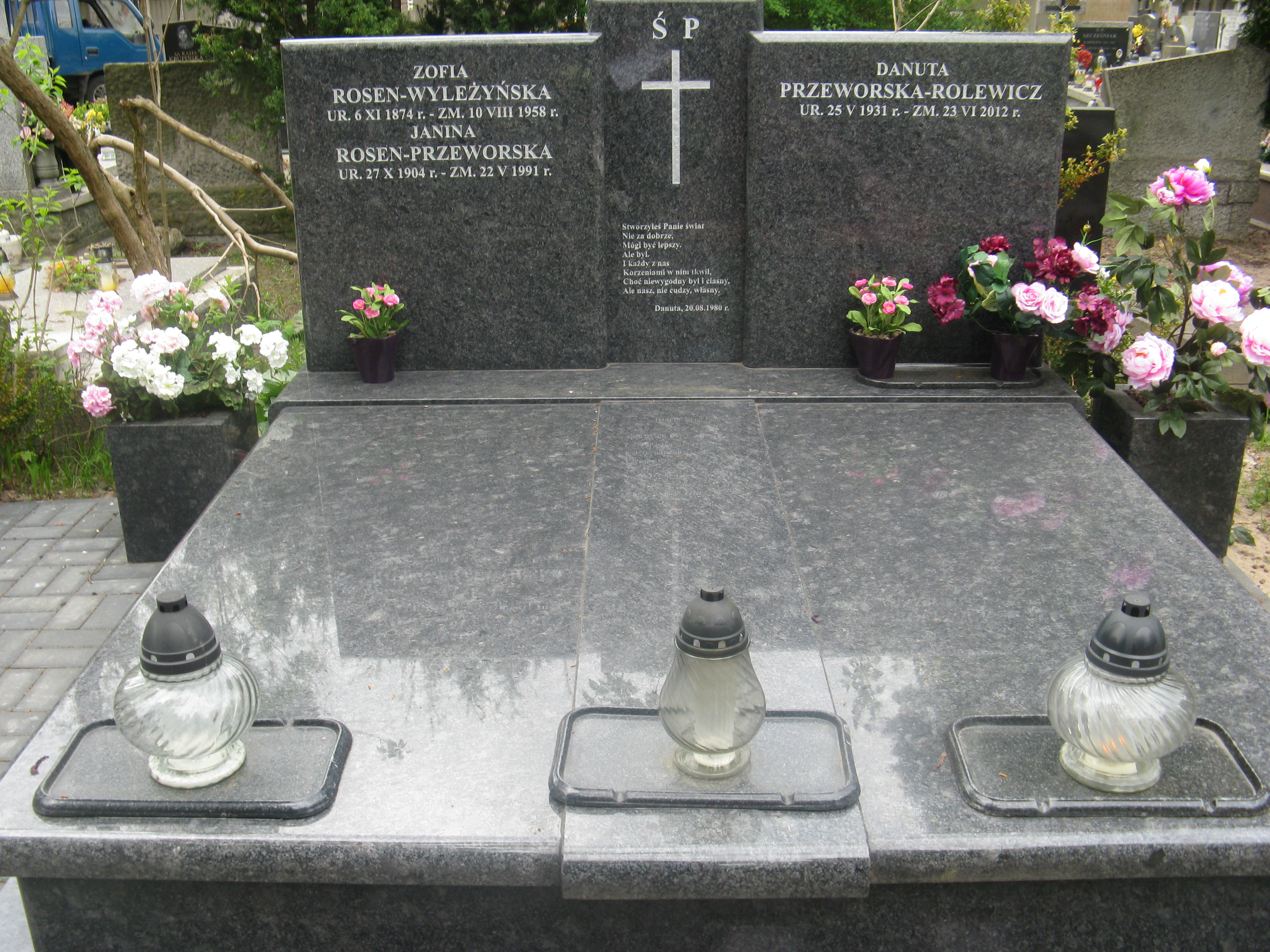
Gravesite of Przeworska-Rolewicz Powązki Military Cemetery in Warsaw

After the secondary school, she began studies at the Faculty of Mathematics of the University of Warsaw, where in 1956 she obtained a master's degree. Then she started research work at the Mathematical Institute of the Polish Academy of Sciences. In 1958 she obtained the title of doctor (with her dissertation titled On systems of strongly-singular integral equations, under the supervision of Witold Pogorzelski), and in 1964 she successfully defended her habilitation thesis.

From 1954 to 1960 she worked as an assistant and lecturer at the Warsaw University of Technology, from 1960 she lectured at the Mathematical Institute of the Polish Academy of Sciences. In 1973, she lectured for a year at the Cybernetics Department of the Military University of Technology where she taught algebraic analysis classes using an experimental method of her own invention. In 1974, she obtained the title of professor of mathematical sciences and she went on to supervise nine PhD students.

Przeworska-Rolewicz's fields of interest included singular integral equations, algebraic methods in analysis / operational calculus, functional analysis and others. Her scientific achievements include more than 200 scientific papers and four textbooks. Danuta Przeworska-Rolewicz was the organizer of the international conferences organized in Warsaw entitled "Functional-differential systems and related systems," which took place in 1979, 1981, 1983 and 1985, and then "Various aspects of differentiability" in 1993 and 1995. The conferences attempted to build collaborative research relationships among the attendees.

She was among the founders of the Fractional Calculus and Applied Analysis journal, and she was also a member of the editorial boards of Demonstratio Mathematica (since 1987), Scientiae Mathematicae (since 1997) and Matematica Japonica (since 1998).

=== Personal life ===
She married the Polish mathematician and colleague Stefan Henryk Rolewicz (1932–2015) in January 1952 and they had two children

On 23 August 1980, she joined the appeal of 64 scholars, writers and journalists to the communist authorities for dialogue with striking workers.

Danuta Przeworska-Rolewicz died in Warsaw in June 2012 and is buried at the Powązki Military Cemetery in Warsaw (section G-2-2/3).

== Awards ==
- Warsaw Uprising Cross (1982)
- Gold Cross of Merit (1985)
- Stefan-Banach Prize of the Polish Mathematical Society (1969)
- Prize of the Polish Academy of Sciences (1972)
- Prize of the German Academy of Sciences and the Polish Academy of Sciences (1978)
