= Woerner =

Woerner is a surname. Notable people with the surname include:

- Carrie Woerner (born 1962), American politician
- Charlie Woerner (born 1997), American football player
- Frederick F. Woerner Jr. (1933–2023), American general
- K. Woerner, American gymnast
- Klaus Woerner (1939–2005), Canadian businessman
- Marlene Woerner (1918–2010), German sculptor
- Scott Woerner (born 1958), American football player

== See also ==
- Woerner Field
- Louis and Elizabeth Woerner House
- Worner (disambiguation)
