= Rupert Scholz =

German politician (born 1937)

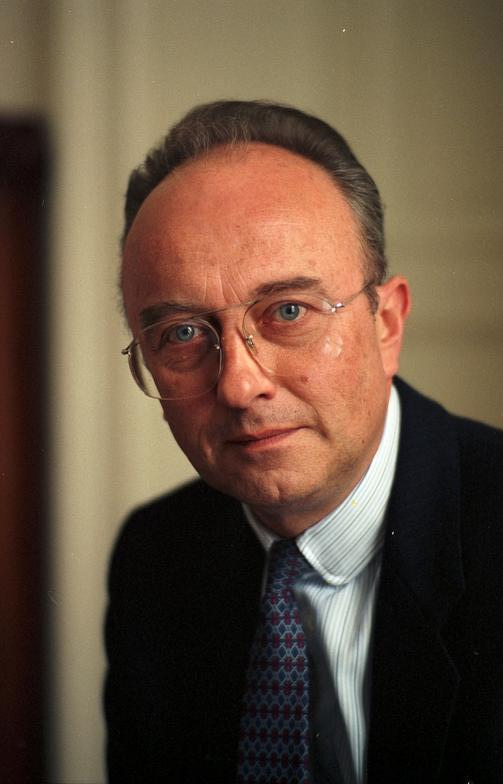

German Federal Minister of Defence (West Germany)
- In office 18 May 1988 – 21 April 1989
- Chancellor: Helmut Kohl
- Preceded by: Manfred Wörner
- Succeeded by: Gerhard Stoltenberg

Member of the German Bundestag
- In office 20 December 1990 – 17 October 2002

Personal details
- Born: 23 May 1937 (age 89) Berlin, Nazi Germany
- Party: Christian Democratic Union (1983–present)
- Education: Free University of Berlin; LMU Munich
- Occupation: Professor for Public Law

Rupert Scholz (born 23 May 1937) is a German politician of the Christian Democratic Union.

== Early life and education ==
Scholz was born in Berlin and received his Abitur in 1957. He studied law and economic at the Free University of Berlin and LMU Munich. He completed his first Staatsexamen in 1961, received his doctorate in 1966 with Peter Lerche as Doktorvater at LMU Munich with the work Das Wesen und die Entwicklung der gemeindlichen öffentlichen Einrichtungen, completed his second Staatsexamen in 1967 and habilitated in 1971 at LMU Munich with the work Die Koalitionsfreiheit als Verfassungsproblem. In 1972, he became a law professor at the Free University of Berlin. In 1978, he accepted the chair of state, administrative and finance law at LMU Munich. He retired from the post in 2005.

== Political career ==
From 1981 to 1983, Scholz was Senator for Justice under Berlin Governing Mayor Richard von Weizsäcker and Senator for Federal Affairs under Weizsäcker and his successor Eberhard Diepgen from 1982 to 1988. Scholz joined the Christian Democratic Union of Germany (CDU) in 1983. From 1985 to 1988, he was a member of the Abgeordnetenhaus of Berlin. From 1990 to 2002, he was a member of the Bundestag and Chairman of the CDU/CSU parliamentary group from 1994 to 1998. From 1998 to 2002, he was chairman of the Legal Committee. From 1998 to 2001, he was Deputy State Chairman of the CDU Berlin. In the 2002 German federal election he was passed over in his constituency (Berlin-Tempelhof) by his party against his will.

== Defence Minister ==
On 18 May 1988, Scholz was appointed Federal Minister of Defence in the cabinet of Chancellor Helmut Kohl. Gerhard Stoltenberg succeeded him in the post in the cabinet reshuffle in 1989.

In 2007, Scholz stated that Germany should strive to become a nuclear power.

Political offices
Preceded by Manfred Wörner	Federal Minister of Defence (Germany); 1988–1989	Succeeded by Gerhard Stoltenberg
