= Boyan Petkanchin =

Bulgarian mathematician (1907–1987)

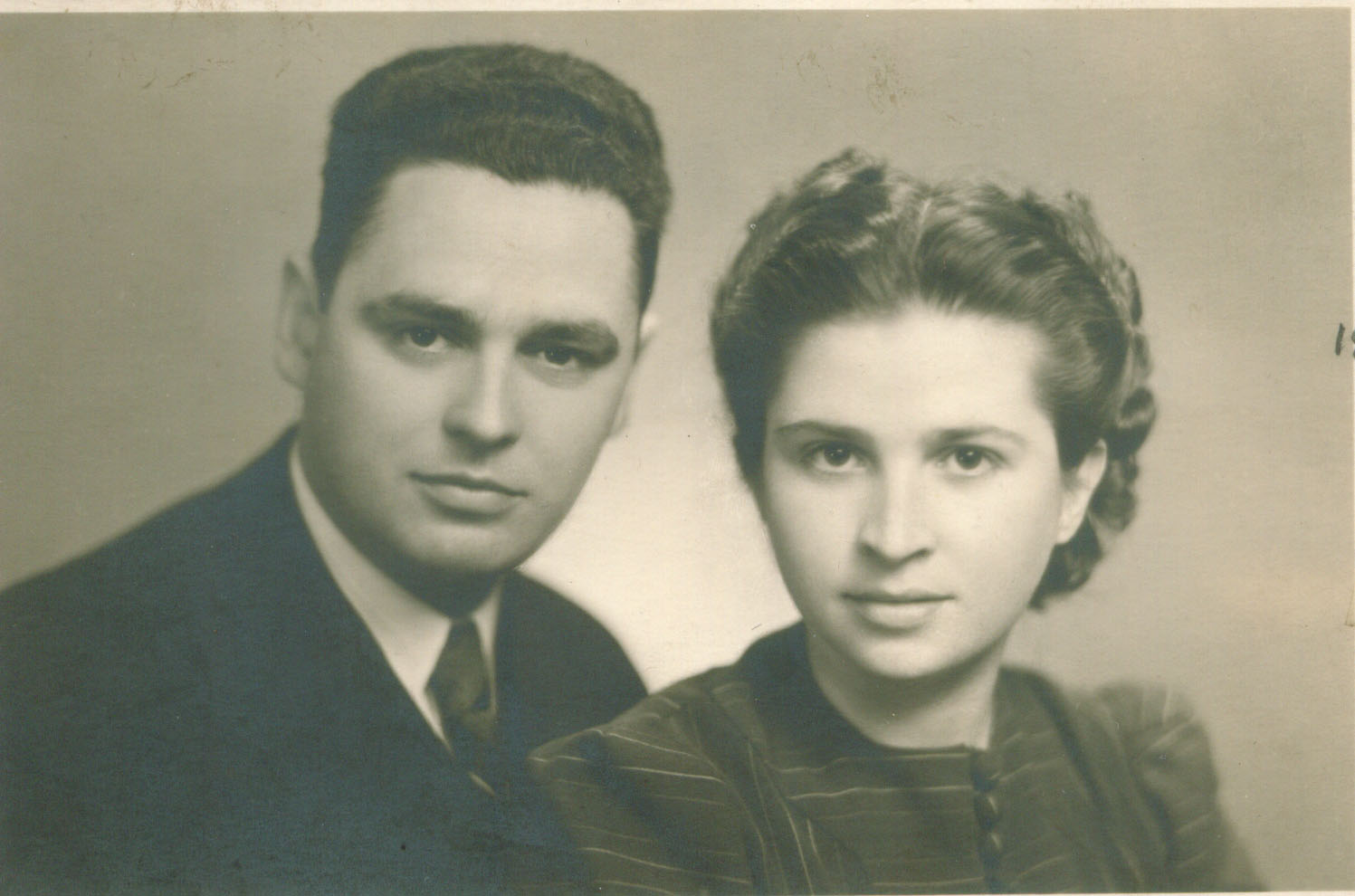
Photo of Boyan petkanchin

Boyan Petkanchin (Bulgarian: Боян Петканчин) (April 8, 1907 – March 3, 1987) was a prominent Bulgarian mathematician, working in geometry and foundation of mathematics. As a first chairman of the Department of Mathematical Logic at the Bulgarian Academy of Sciences he worked to promote and disseminate the knowledge of mathematical logic both in the professional mathematical community in Bulgaria and as popular science.
