= Yuri Luchko =

German mathematician

Yuri Luchko is a German professor of mathematics at the Berlin University of Applied Sciences and Technology. His 90 works were peer reviewed and appeared in such journals as the Fractional Calculus and Applied Analysis and Journal of Mathematical Analysis and Applications, among others.
