= Małgorzata Klimek =

Polish mathematician

Małgorzata Klimek (born 1957) is a Polish mathematical analyst and mathematical physicist known for her research on the fractional calculus and fractional differential equations. She is a professor in the Institute of Mathematics and Dean of the Faculty of Mechanical Engineering and Computer Science at Częstochowa University of Technology in Poland.

== Education and career ==
Klimek was born on 16 July 1957, in Bielsko-Biała. She earned a master's degree in mathematics at the Wrocław University of Science and Technology in 1981, and earned a Ph.D. in 1993 through the Institute of Theoretical Physics of the University of Wrocław, supervised by Jerzy Lukierski. She completed her habilitation through the Institute of Theoretical Physics in 2003.

Klimek joined the staff of the Częstochowa University of Technology in 1985. She was named a full professor in 2015, and is Dean of the Faculty of Mechanical Engineering and Computer Science. She was president of the Częstochowa Branch of the Polish Mathematical Society for 2011–2013.

As well as many journal publications, she is the author of a research monograph on fractional differential equations, and two textbooks.

== Recognition ==
Klimek has been given multiple awards by the rector of the Częstochowa University of Technology for her research and organizational accomplishments. In 2010 she was given the medal of the Commission of National Education.
