= Manfred Wörner =

German politician and diplomat (1934–1994)

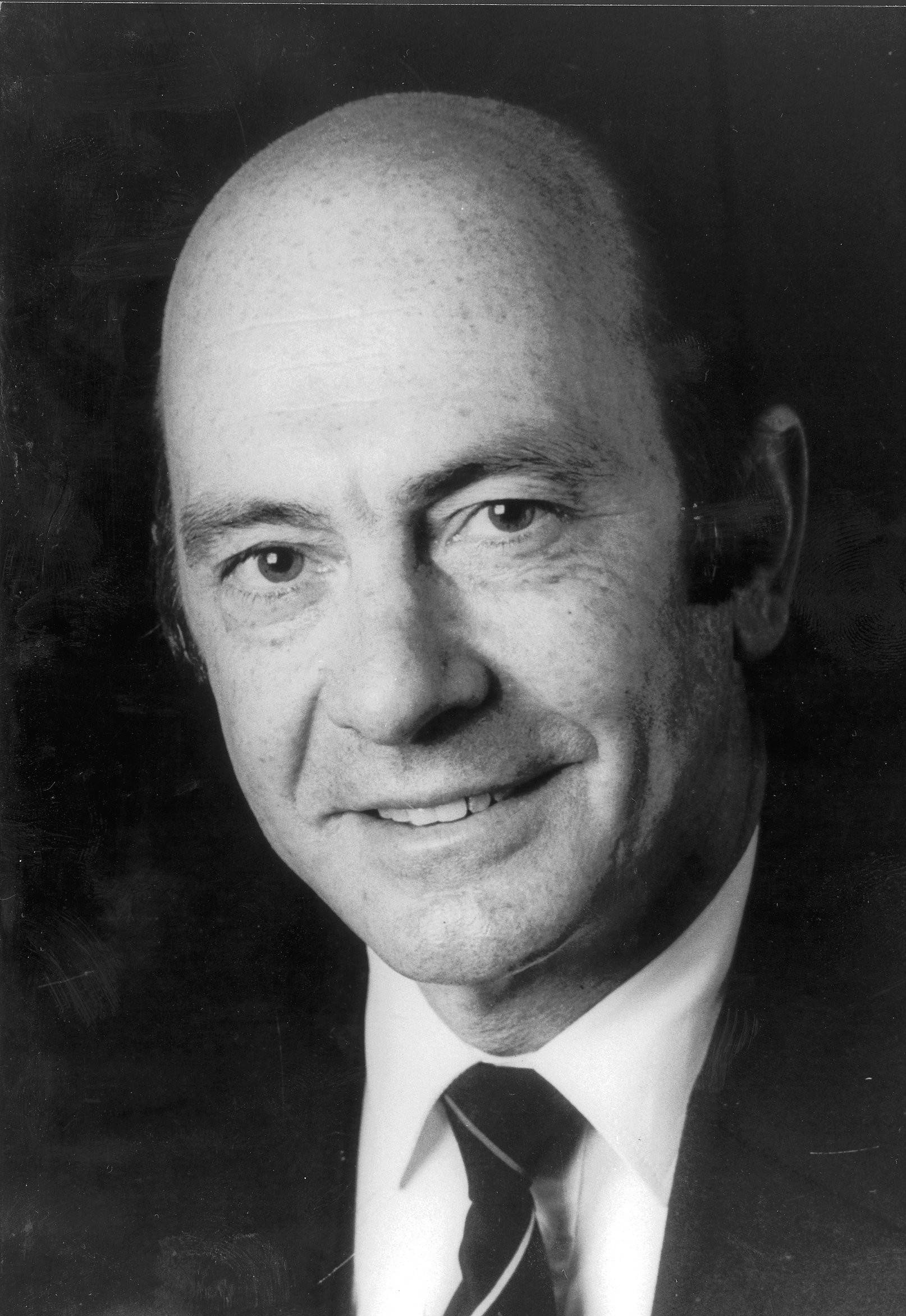

7th Secretary General of NATO
- In office 1 July 1988 – 13 August 1994
- Preceded by: The Lord Carrington
- Succeeded by: Sergio Balanzino (acting); Willy Claes

Federal Minister of Defence (West Germany)
- In office 4 October 1982 – 18 May 1988
- Chancellor: Helmut Kohl
- Preceded by: Hans Apel
- Succeeded by: Rupert Scholz

Deputy Chairman of the CDU/CSU Parliamentary Group in the Bundestag
- In office 20 October 1969 – 13 December 1972

Member of the Bundestag; for Göppingen
- In office 19 October 1965 – 30 June 1988
- Preceded by: Hermann Finckh
- Succeeded by: Claus Jäger

Personal details
- Born: Manfred Hermann Wörner; 24 September 1934 Stuttgart, Germany
- Died: 13 August 1994 (aged 59) Brussels, Belgium
- Party: Christian Democratic Union
- Spouse(s): Anna-Maria Casar (m. 1972–1982) Elfrie Hartwig Reinsch (m. 1982)
- Education: Heidelberg University; University of Paris; Ph.D. Ludwig-Maximilians-Universität München
- Profession: Diplomat

Manfred Hermann Wörner (24 September 1934 – 13 August 1994) was a German politician and diplomat. He served as the defence minister of West Germany between 1982 and 1988. He then served as the seventh secretary general of NATO from 1988 to 1994. His term as Secretary General saw the end of the Cold War and the German reunification. Whilst serving in that position, he was diagnosed with cancer, but, in spite of his illness, continued serving until his final days.

== Family ==
He grew up in his grandfather's house in Stuttgart-Bad Cannstatt and attended the Johannes-Kepler-Gymnasium there. He was married to Elfie Wörner, who supported several German army-related humanitarian agencies, and who died of a tumour on 4 July 2006.

== Education ==
After graduation in 1953, he studied law at Heidelberg University, the University of Paris, and the Ludwig-Maximilians-Universität München. He finished his studies in 1957 with the first and in 1961 the second Staatsexamen. He got his Dr. jur. in 1961, writing about International law. Afterwards, he worked for the administration of Baden-Württemberg. He was a county official for Oehringen until 1962, for the Baden-Württemberg Landtag until 1965 and the county Göppingen. Wörner was a jet pilot and reserve officer in the Luftwaffe.

== Political career ==
Wörner was a member of the German CDU and was elected to the German parliament, representing Göppingen.

On 4 October 1982, he was appointed Federal Minister of Defence in Helmut Kohl's government. Wörner played an important role in defending NATO's decision to deploy intermediate-range ballistic missiles IRBM after arms reduction talks with the Soviet Union to reverse Soviet deployment of its SS-20 intermediate-range ballistic missiles IRBM from the years before.

In 1983, Wörner faced criticism due to the scandal surrounding German General Günter Kießling. The German military Secret Service had accused Kießling of being homosexual—this was later revealed to be a case of mistaken identity—and Wörner had ordered Kießling's early retirement, as homosexuality was considered a security risk at the time. Kießling insisted on disciplinary procedures against himself and eventually achieved his reinstatement. Wörner accepted political responsibility for the affair, and on 18 May 1984, he offered his resignation, which was rejected by German Chancellor Helmut Kohl.

== Secretary-General of NATO (1988-1994) ==
In December 1987, the 16 members of NATO elected Wörner as Secretary General. He was the first German to be appointed to that position. Resigning from his post in the German government, he took office on 1 July 1988.

An address given by Wörner in 1990 to the Bremer Tabak Collegium became a subject of a controversy when Vladimir Putin cited it in his 2007 speech at 43rd Munich Conference on Security Policy to claim that NATO made a promise not to expand eastward after the end of the Cold War.

Wörner executed his duties as NATO Secretary General despite severe illness and until his death from colorectal cancer in 1994. He is buried at the cemetery of Hohenstaufen nearby Göppingen.

== Personal life ==
In December 1972, Wörner married Anna-Maria Caesar. From 1982 until his death he was married with Elfie Wörner, née Reinsch (1941–2006).

== Medal ==
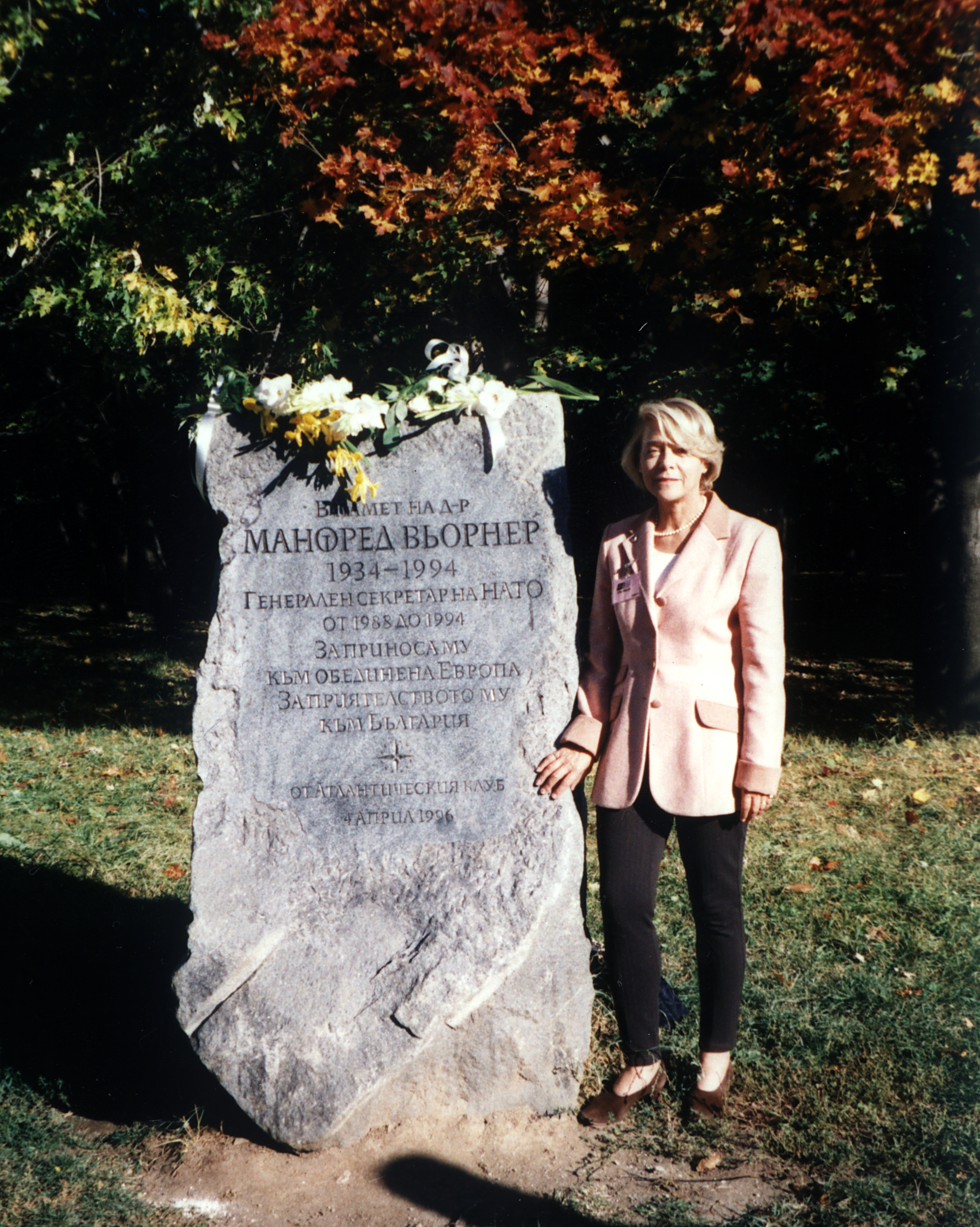
Dr. Wörner's wife Elfie at his monument in South Park, Sofia, Bulgaria

Since 1996, the Ministry of Defence has awarded the Manfred Wörner Medal on an annual basis to honour public figures who have rendered "special meritorious service to peace and freedom in Europe".

Since then, it was given to:

- 1996 Richard Holbrooke, US diplomat and Special Envoy in Bosnia and Kosovo
- 1997 Ewald-Heinrich von Kleist-Schmenzin, publisher and initiator of the Munich Conference on Security Policy
- 1998 Dr. Gerd Wagner (postmortem), for the implementation of the Dayton Agreement
- 1999 Dr. Janusz Onyszkiewicz, Minister of Defense of Poland
- 2000 Elizabeth Pond, American Journalist
- 2001 Karsten Voigt, Coordinator at the German State Department for the German-American Cooperation
- 2002 Javier Solana, the European Union's foreign policy chief and former Secretary General of NATO
- 2003 Prof. Dr. Catherine McArdle Kelleher, U.S. Naval War College and former Head of the Aspen Institute Berlin
- 2005 Hans Koschnick
- 2006 Christian Schwarz-Schilling
- 2007 Martti Ahtisaari
- 2009 Jörg Schönbohm
- 2011 Hans-Friedrich von Ploetz, German diplomat

== Honours ==
The Manfred-Wörner-Seminar, a security-policy information seminar of the German Federal Ministry of Defence for young civilian executive personnel from Germany, the United States and other European nations, is named after Manfred Wörner to honour his merits on transatlantic dialogue and understanding.

Wörner Gap on Livingston Island in the South Shetland Islands, Antarctica is named after Dr. Wörner in recognition of his contribution to European unification.

== See also ==
- Manfred Wörner Foundation

Political offices
Preceded by Hans Apel	Federal Minister of Defence (Germany); 1982–1988	Succeeded by Rupert Scholz
Diplomatic posts
Preceded by Peter Carington, 6th Baron Carrington	Secretary General of NATO; 1988–1994	Succeeded by Willy Claes
