= Elfie Wörner =

German journalist and humanitarian (1941–2006)

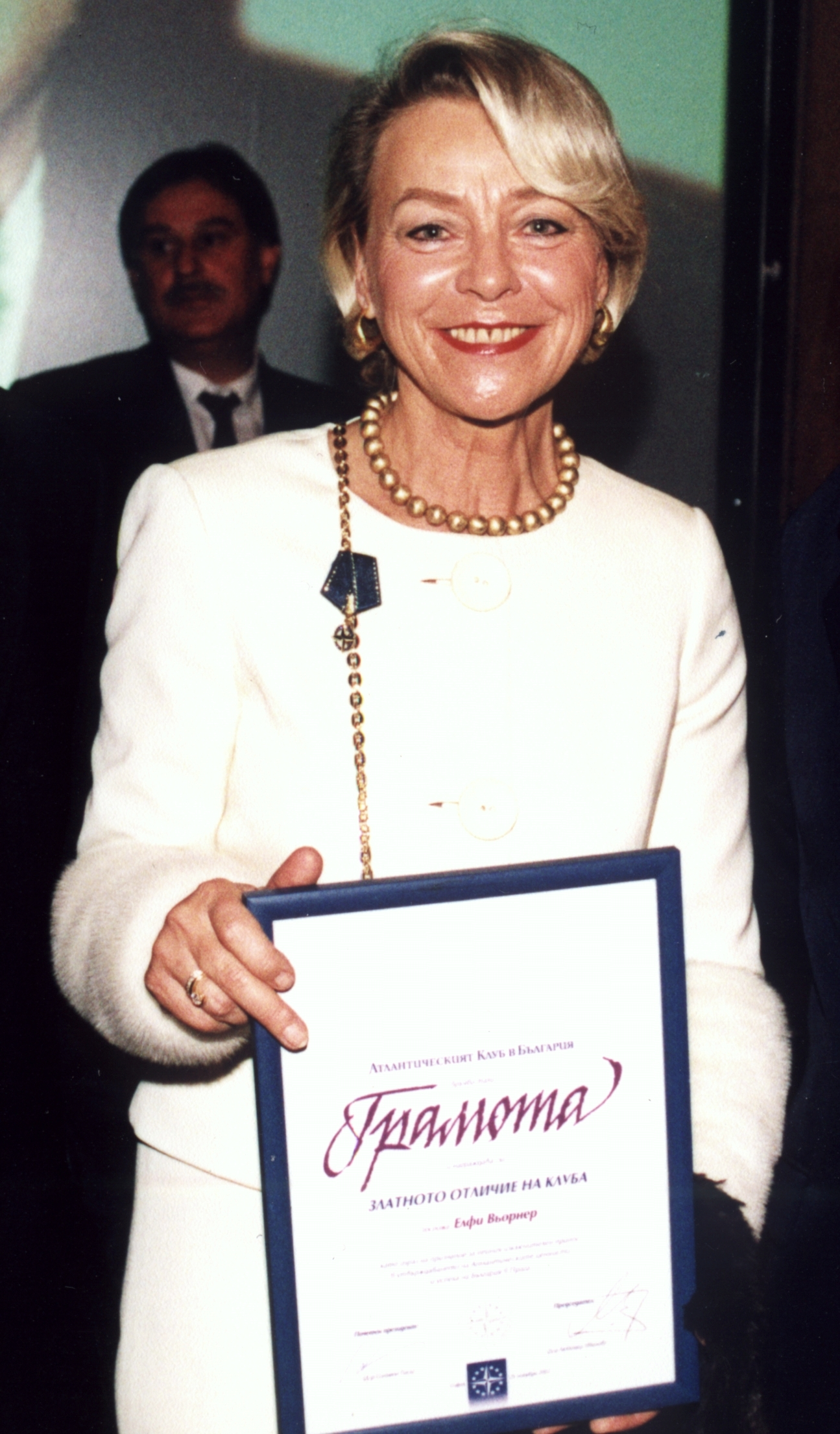
Elfie Wörner

Elfie Wörner (31 July 1941 in Berlin – 4 July 2006 in Munich) was a German journalist, humanitarian and the second wife of Manfred Wörner, who served as the Secretary General of NATO. Elfie Wörner took part in numerous charitable and other non-governmental activities, and was the patron of the German Army Social Work Society, the Special Children in German Military Families, and the Manfred Wörner Foundation, and was a member of the advisory board of Hilfe für Bosnien-Herzegowina (Help for Bosnia and Herzegovina).

She was bestowed with the Golden Award of the Atlantic Club of Bulgaria and received the Order of Merit of the Federal Republic of Germany. The Elfie Wörner Foundation is named in her honour.
