= Bremer Tabak Collegium =

German organisation

The Bremer Tabak Collegium was founded by Bremen merchants in the 1950s to advance discussions on topics of contemporary history with representatives from business, politics, science and culture.
