= Juan José Nieto Roig =

Spanish mathematician

Juan José Nieto Roig (born 1958, A Coruña) is a Spanish mathematician, professor of mathematical analysis at the University of Santiago de Compostela since 1991 and a Royal Galician Academy of Sciences Fellow. His most influential contributions to date are in the area of differential equations.

Nieto received his degree in mathematics at the University of Santiago de Compostela in 1980. He was awarded a Fulbright scholarship and proceeded to the University of Texas at Arlington, where he worked with professor Vangipuram Lakshmikantham. He received his Ph.D. in mathematics at the University of Santiago de Compostela in 1983.

Nieto's work may be considered to fall under the ambit of differential equations. His research interests are in fractional calculus, fuzzy equations and epidemiological models. He is one of the most cited mathematicians in the world according to Web of Knowledge and appears in the Thomson Reuters Highly Cited Researchers list. Nieto has also occupied different positions in the University of Santiago de Compostela, such as Dean of Mathematics and Director of the Mathematical Institute. He has also participated as editor in different mathematical journals, being editor in chief of the journal Nonlinear Analysis: Real World Applications from 2009 to 2012. In 2016, Nieto was admitted as a Fellow of the Royal Galician Academy of Sciences.
