= Manfred Wörner Foundation =

Bulgarian think tank

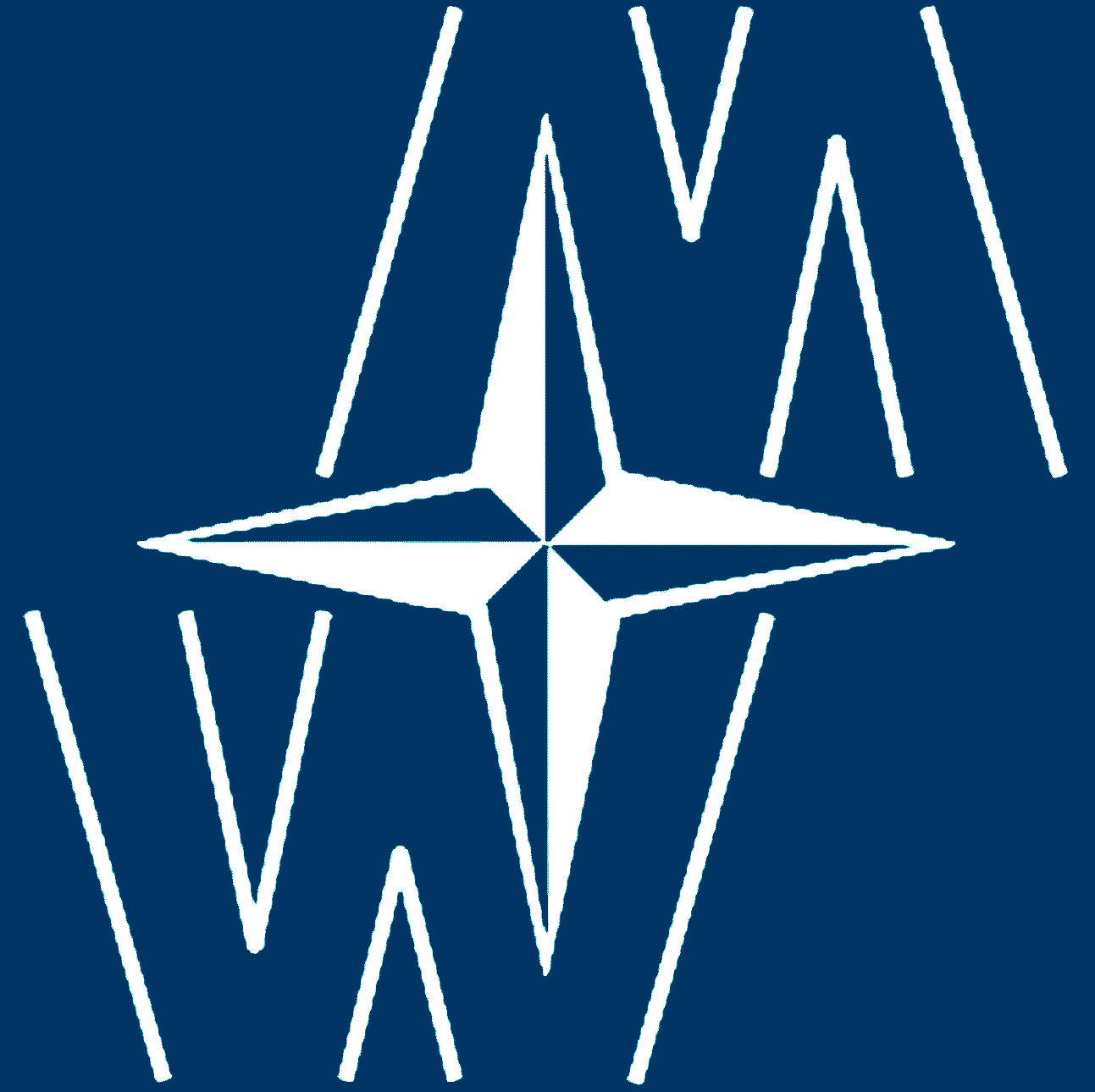
Foundation's logo

The Manfred Wörner Foundation is a Bulgarian not-for-profit non-governmental organization established on 20 October 1994, and registered in 1996. It is named in honour of Manfred Wörner, former secretary-general of NATO.

== Mission ==
Its mission is to foster and project Atlantic values, solidarity and cooperation, help advance the European peace and security policies in a strategic partnership with America, promote personal liberties and economic freedom, support the sustainable economic, social and demographic development of Bulgaria, contribute to the exploration and conservation of the national and world natural heritage, and uphold the European vision of Manfred Wörner (1934–1994).

== Activities ==
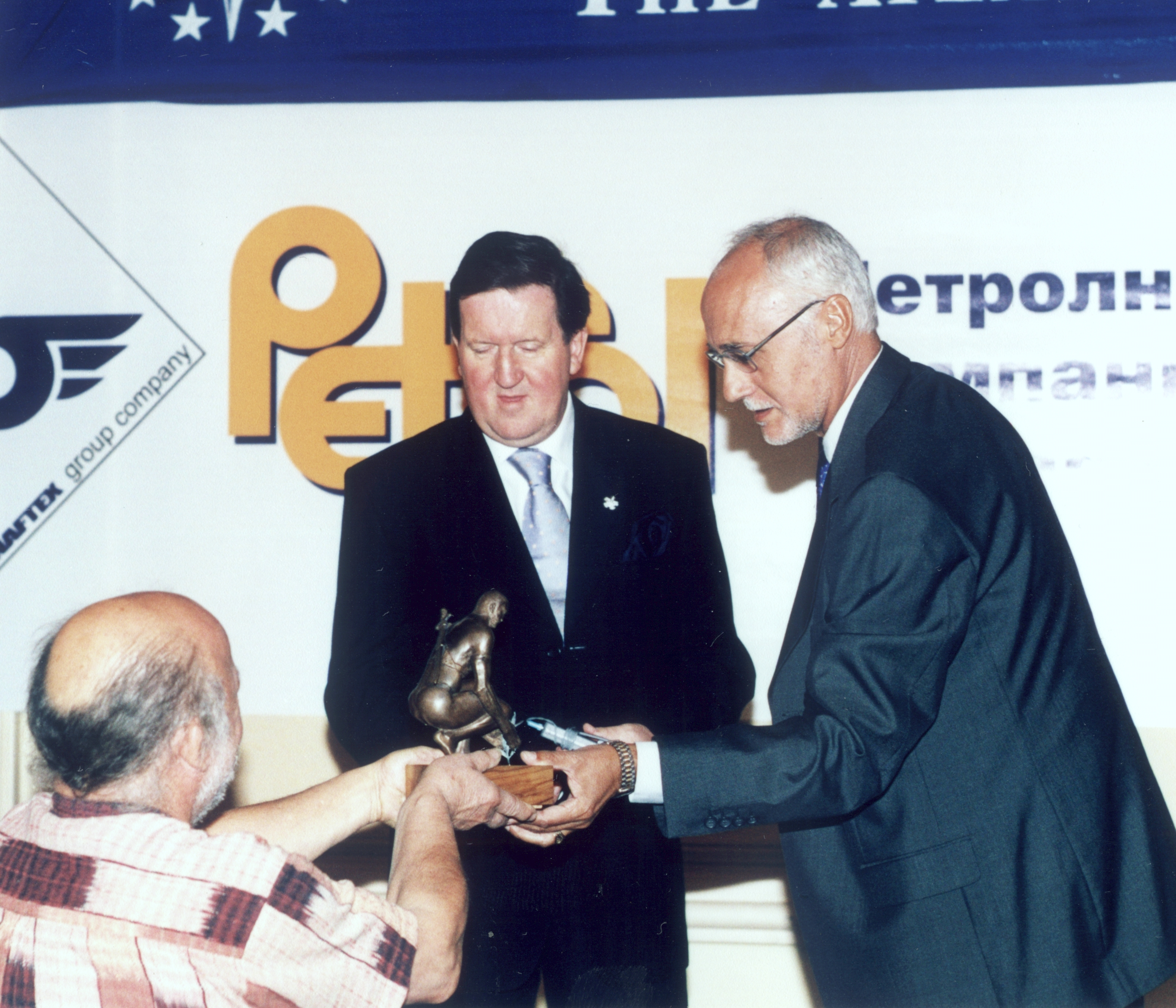
Lord Robertson receiving the Atlantic Solidarity Award

The foundation sponsored the naming of Manfred Wörner Street in Sofia in 1995, the naming of Wörner Gap on Livingston Island, Antarctica, in 1996, and the erection of a Manfred Wörner Monument in South Park, Sofia, in 1996.

The foundation is focusing its activities on training and education, technical assistance to state and local authorities, transboundary regional development, promotion of new immigration policies for Bulgaria, and Antarctic research including the organization and management of the scientific Antarctic expedition Tangra 2004/05 and the establishment of Camp Academia on Livingston Island in the South Shetland Islands, and published Antarctic topographic maps, donating free copies to all Bulgarian schools.

The foundation has established an Atlantic Solidarity Award, given by a jury comprising representatives of the Bulgarian civil society in appreciation of outstanding personal contributions to world peace and liberty. Lord George Robertson became the first recipient of the award in 2003.

The founding president (since 1994) is Lyubomir Ivanov. Elfie Wörner was the honorary director of the foundation in 1997–2006.

== Publications ==
- Rights and Integration of Immigrants in Bulgaria. Sofia: Manfred Wörner Foundation, 2003. 12 pp. (in Bulgarian, Arabic, Russian and English)
- Towards New Immigration Policies for Bulgaria, a collection of papers. Sofia: Manfred Wörner Foundation, 2006. (in Bulgarian, English summary) ISBN 978-954-92032-1-9
- The Future of the Falkland Islands and Its People. Sofia: Manfred Wörner Foundation, 2003. Printed in Bulgaria by Double T Publishers. 96 pp. ISBN 954-91503-1-3
- Immigrants and Refugees in Bulgaria and Their Integration: Guidelines for New Immigration Policies, a collection of papers. Sofia: NI Plus Publishing House, 2003. ISBN 954-91426-5-5
- Bulgarian Policies on the Republic of Macedonia: Recommendations on the development of good neighbourly relations following Bulgaria’s accession to the EU and in the context of NATO and EU enlargement in the Western Balkans. Sofia: Manfred Wörner Foundation, 2008. 80 pp. (Trilingual publication in Bulgarian, Macedonian and English) ISBN 978-954-92032-2-6
- Immigration and Integration: European Experiences. Sofia: Manfred Wörner Foundation, 2008. ISBN 978-954-92032-5-7
- Antarctica: Livingston Island and Greenwich, Robert, Snow and Smith Islands. Scale 1:120000 topographic map. Troyan: Manfred Wörner Foundation, 2009. (in Bulgarian) ISBN 978-954-92032-4-0
- Antarctica: Livingston Island and Greenwich, Robert, Snow and Smith Islands. Scale 1:120000 topographic map. Troyan: Manfred Wörner Foundation, 2009. ISBN 978-954-92032-6-4
- Bulgaria in Antarctica. South Shetland Islands. Sofia: Manfred Wörner Foundation, 2009. 16 pp., with a folded map. ISBN 978-954-92032-7-1
- Antarctic: Nature, History, Utilization, Geographic Names and Bulgarian Participation. Sofia: Manfred Wörner Foundation, 2014. 368 pp. (in Bulgarian) ISBN 978-619-90008-1-6 (Second revised and updated edition, 2014. 411 pp. ISBN 978-619-90008-2-3)
- Bulgarian Names in Antarctica. Sofia: Manfred Wörner Foundation, 2019. 526 pp. (in Bulgarian) ISBN 978-619-90008-4-7 (Second revised and updated edition, 2021. 539 pp. ISBN 978-619-90008-5-4)
- Bowles Ridge and Central Tangra Mountains: Livingston Island, Antarctica. Scale 1:25000 map. Sofia, 2023. ISBN 978-619-90008-6-1
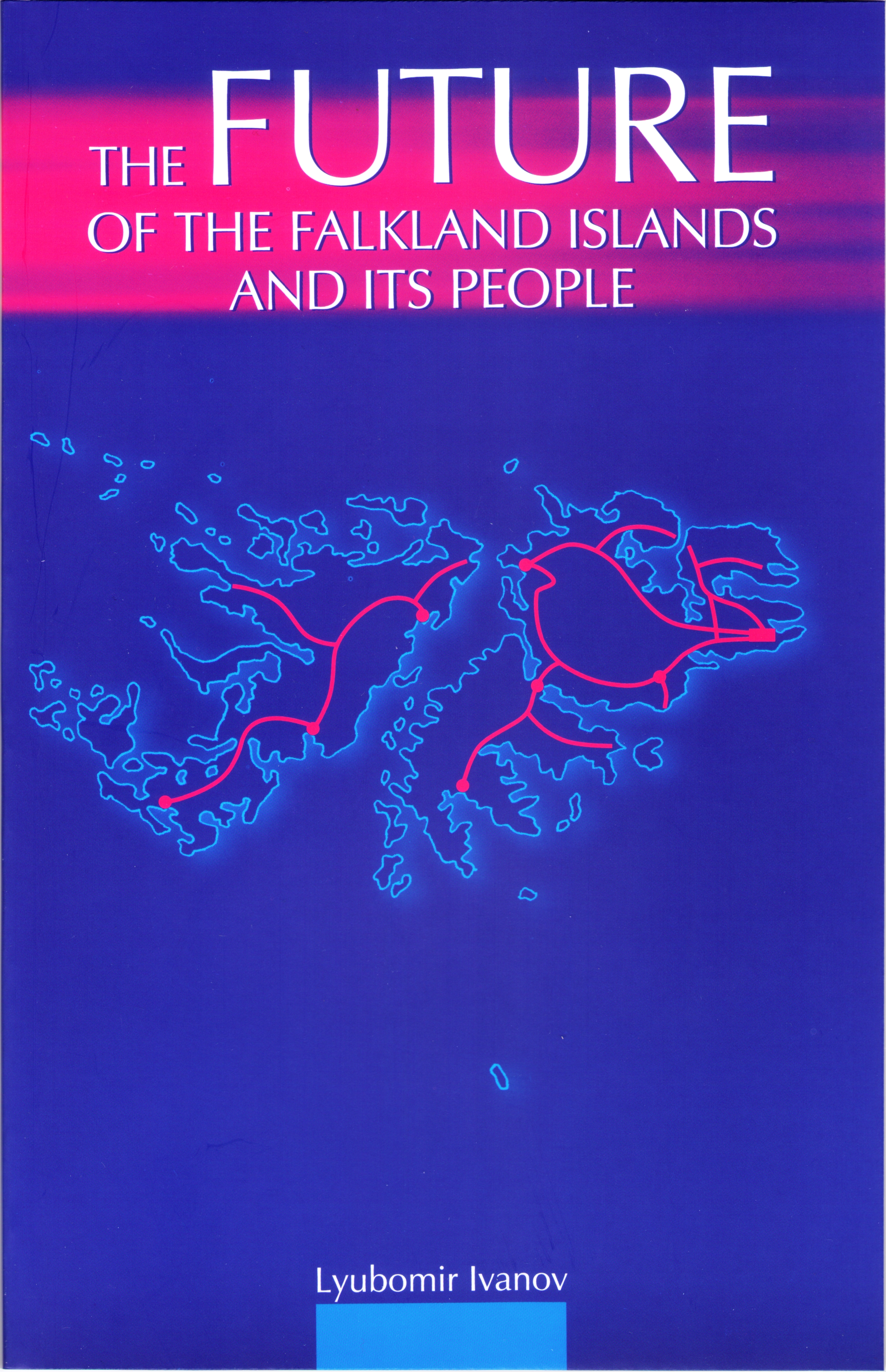
The Future of the Falkland Islands and Its People

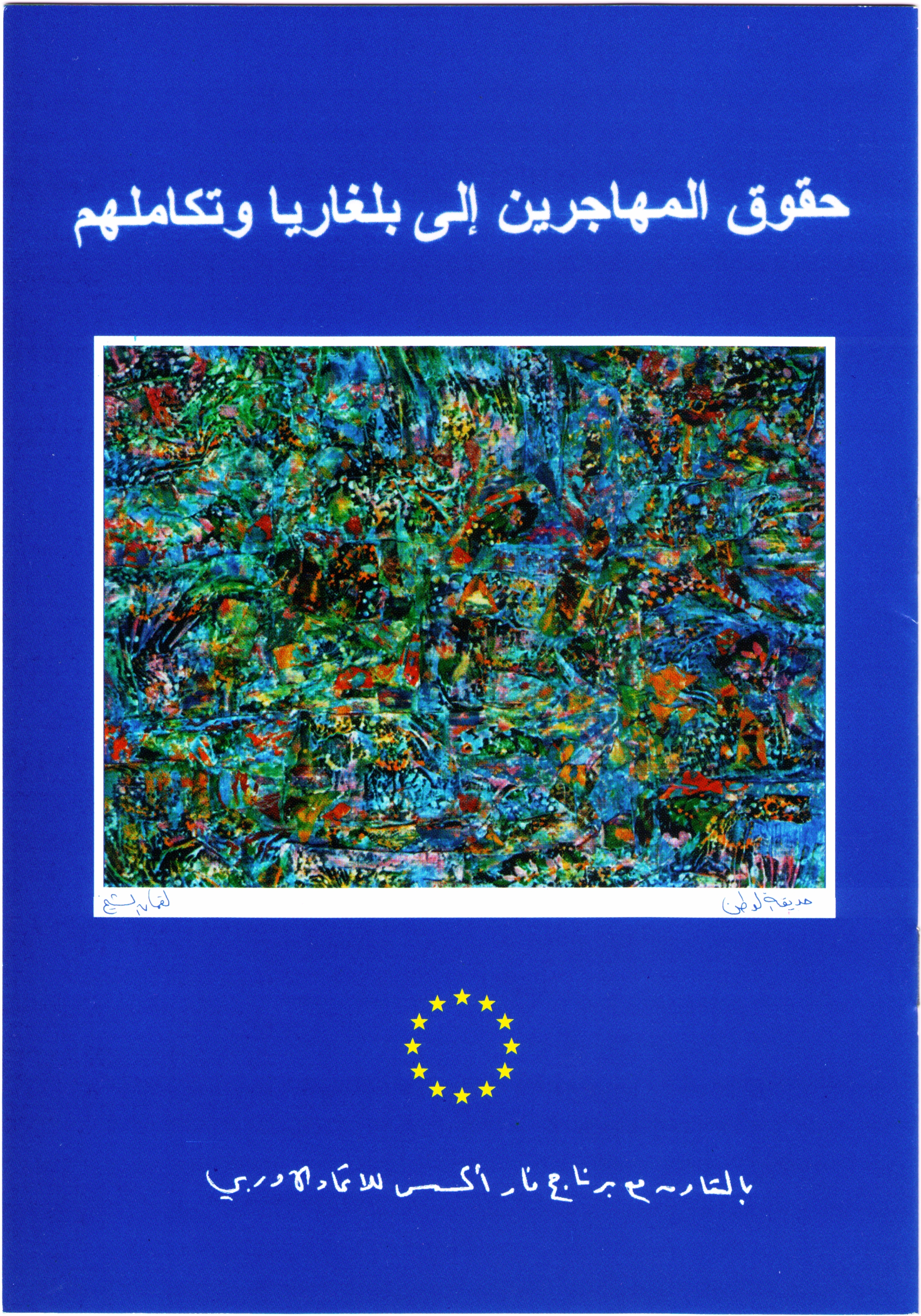
Rights and Integration of Immigrants in Bulgaria

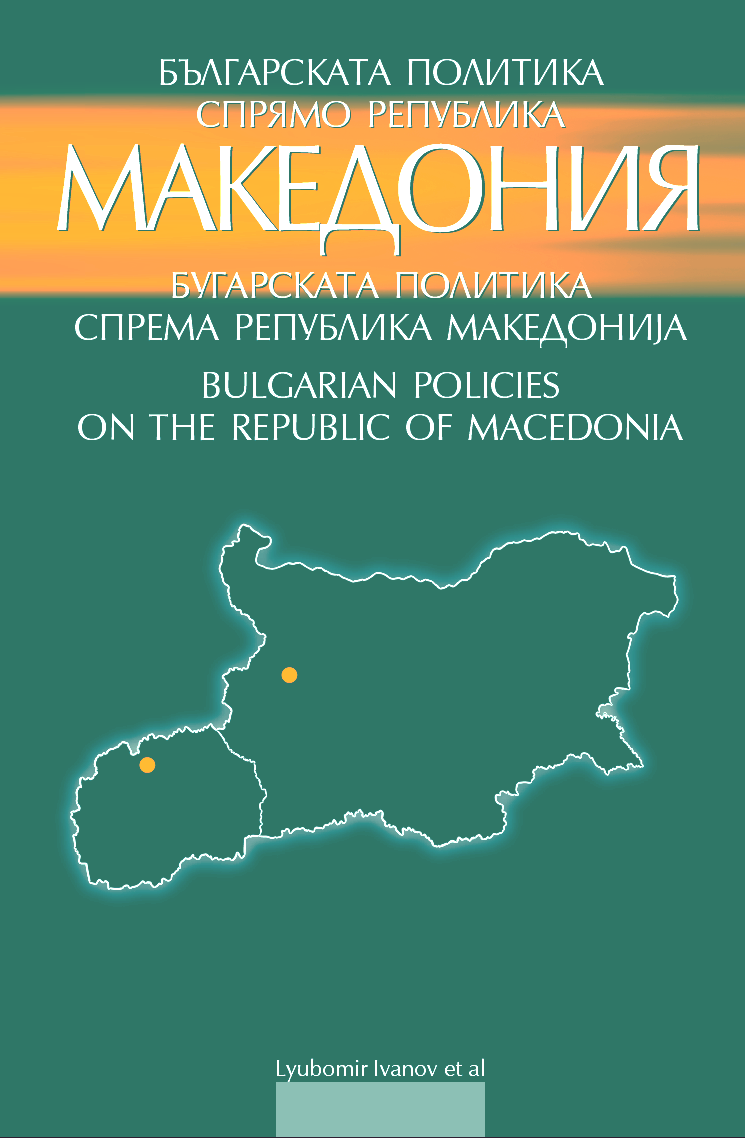
Bulgarian Policies on the Republic of Macedoniaa

Topographic map of Livingston, Greenwich, Robert, Snow and Smith Islands

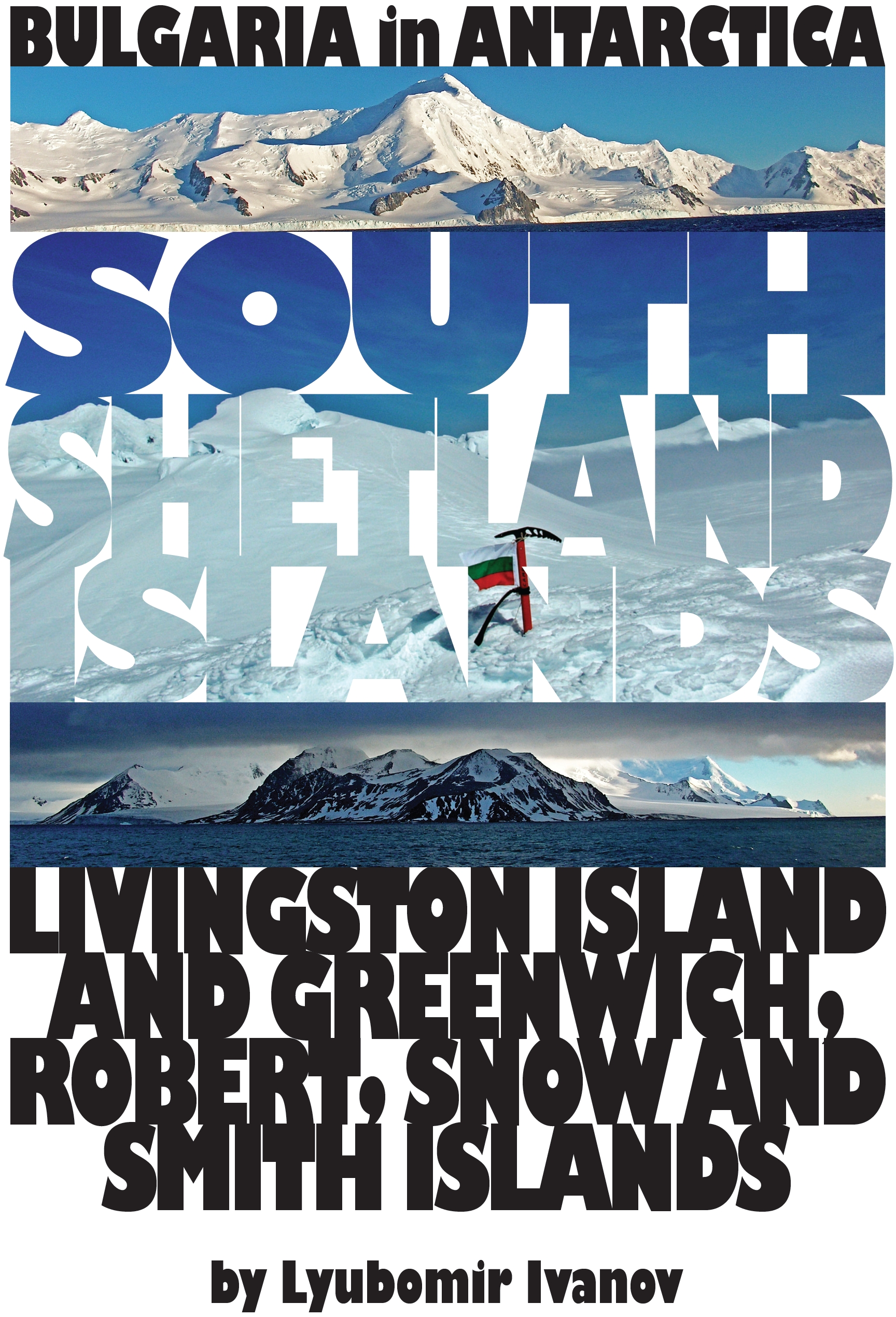
Bulgaria in Antarctica: South Shetland Islands

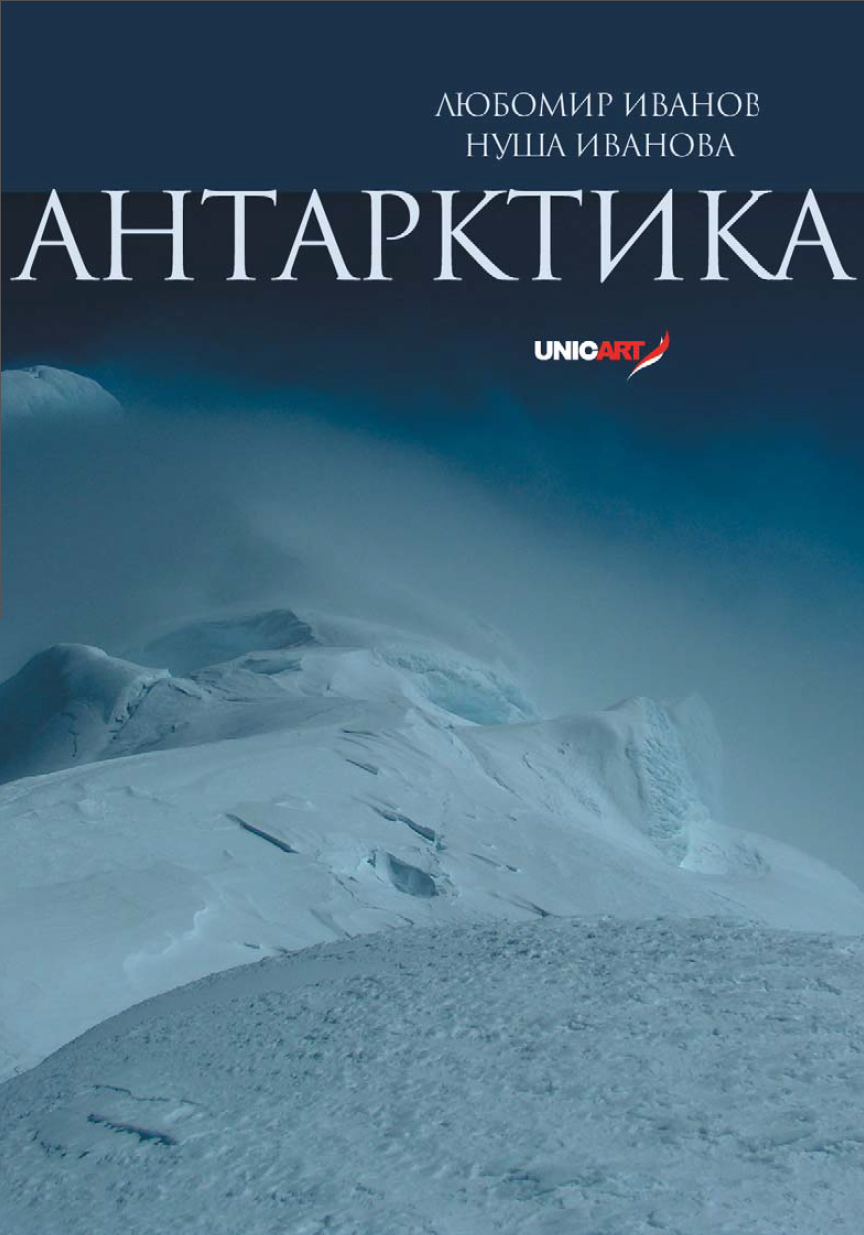
Antarctic: Nature, History, Utilization, Geographic Names and Bulgarian Participation

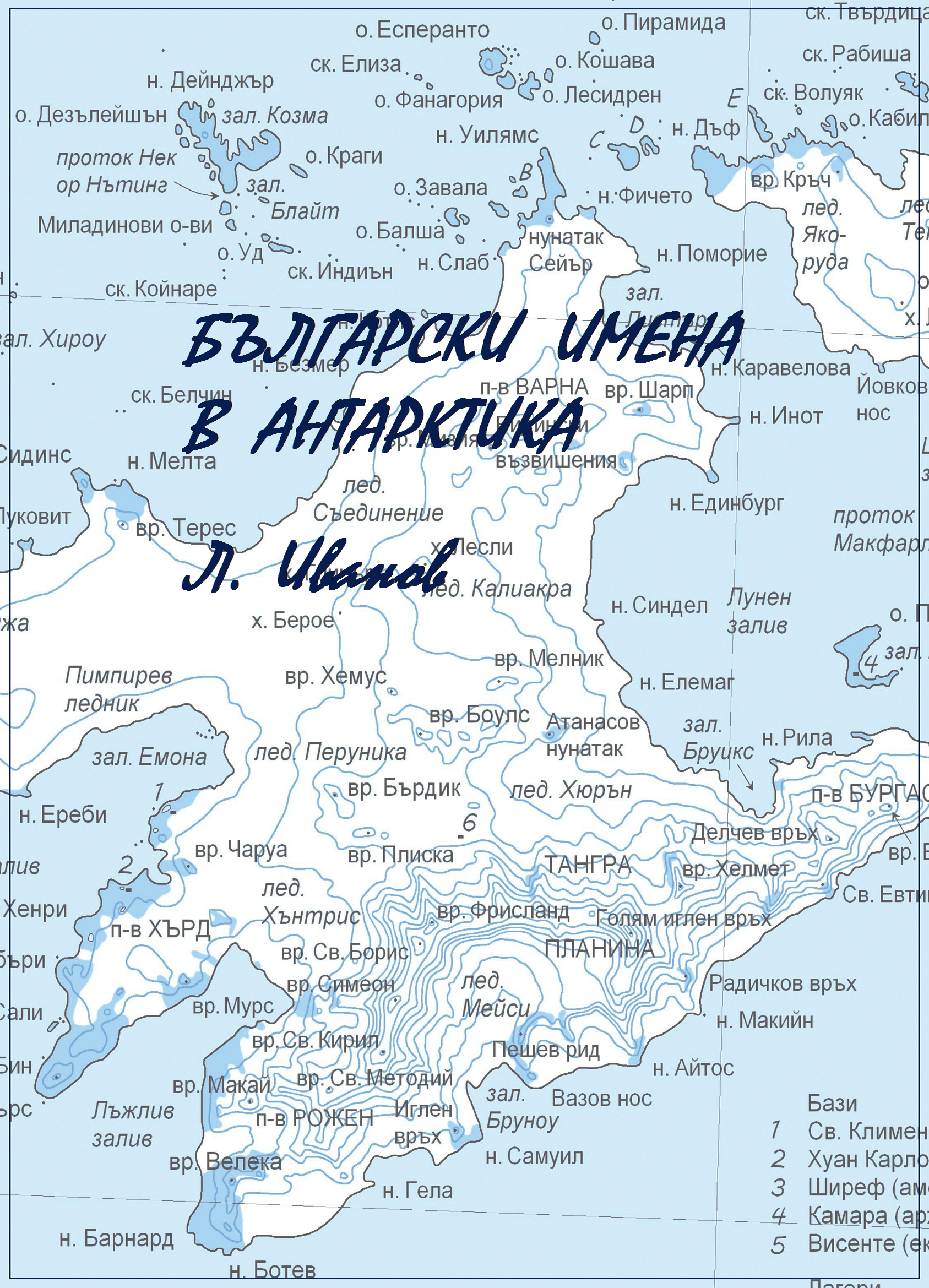
Bulgarian Names in Antarctica

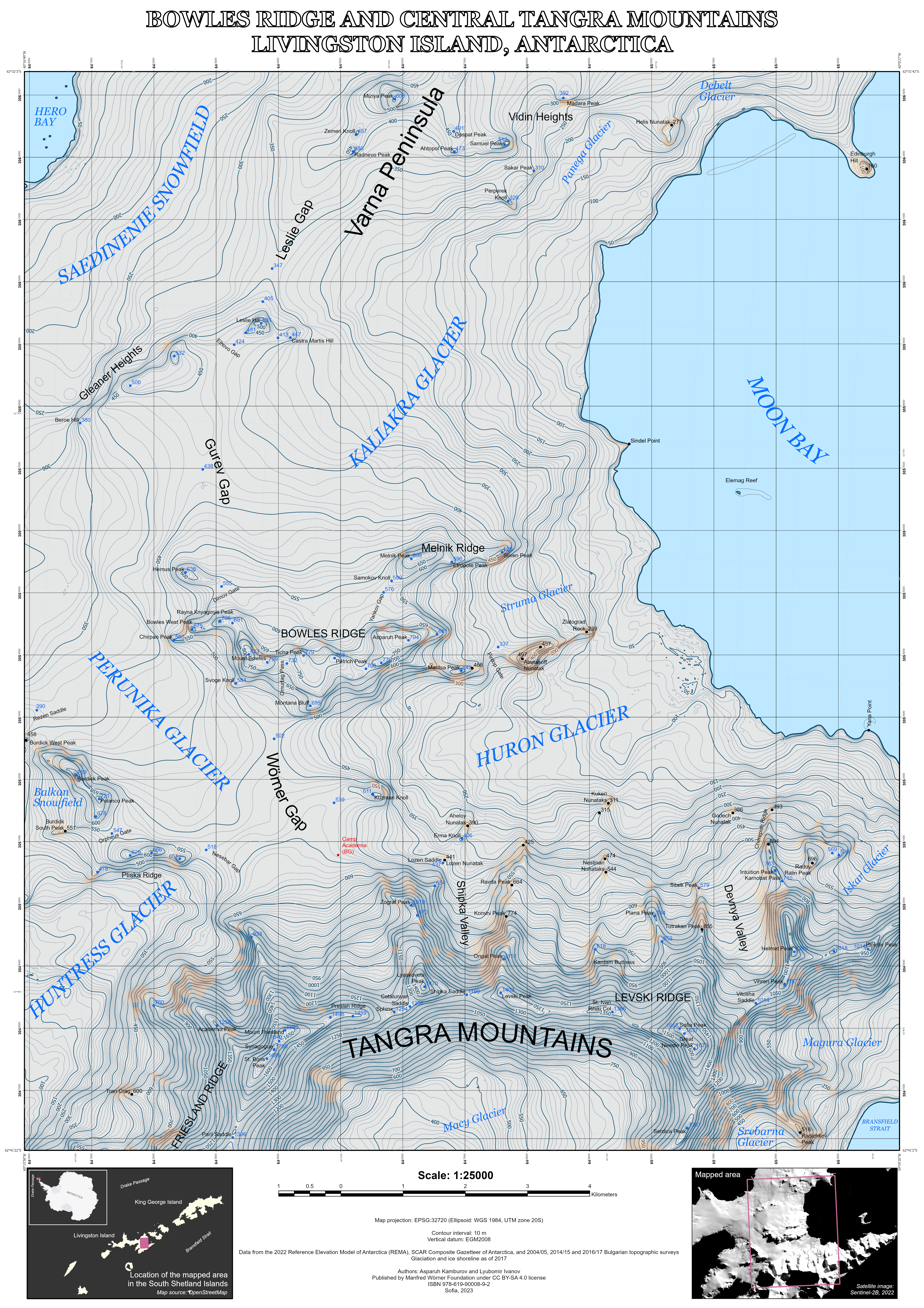
Topographic map of Bowles Ridge and Central Tangra Mountains, Livingston Island

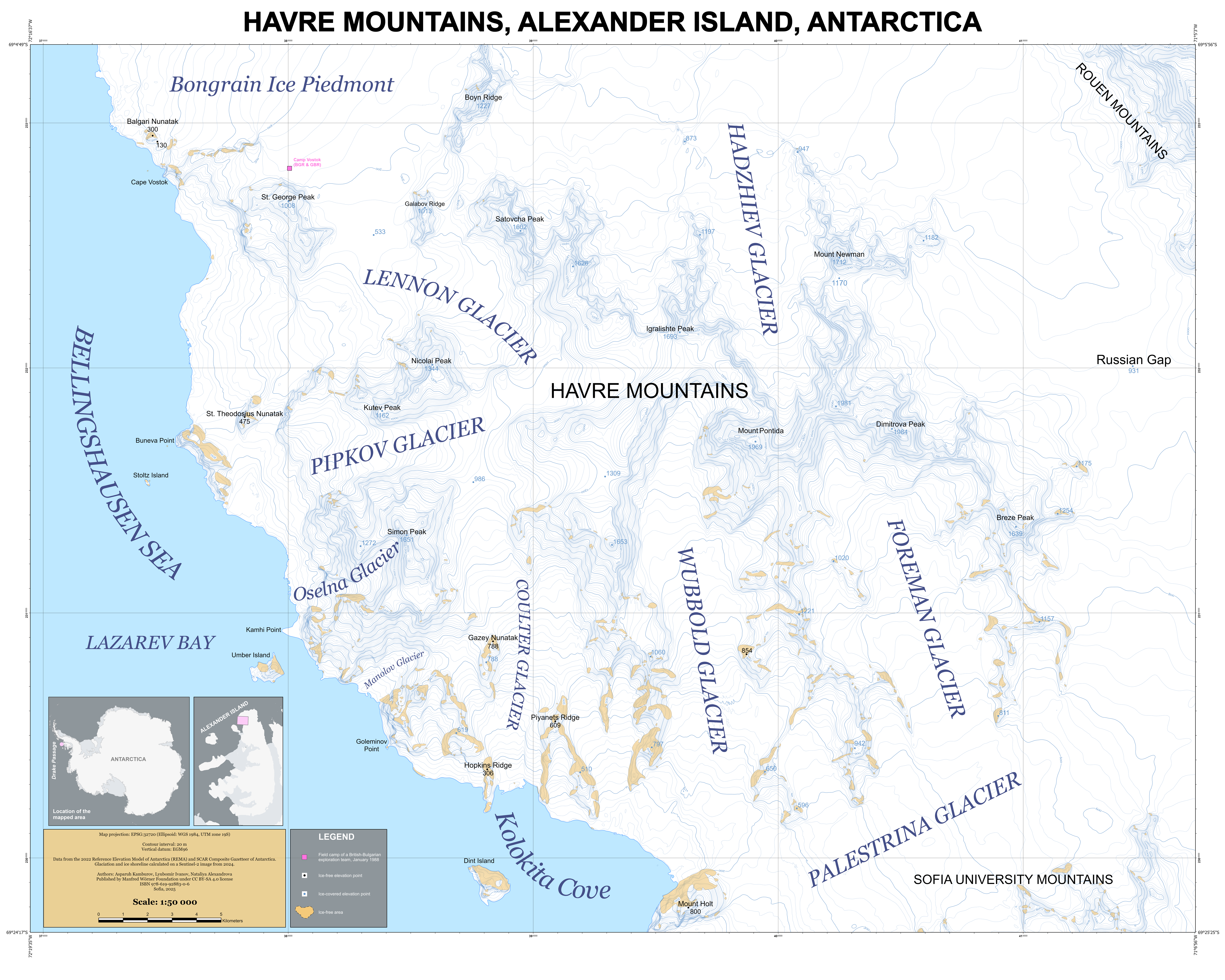
Topographic map of Havre Mountains, Alexander Island in Antarctica

Topographic map of Cape Smith area, Smith Island in Antarctica
