= Dimiter Skordev =

Bulgarian mathematician

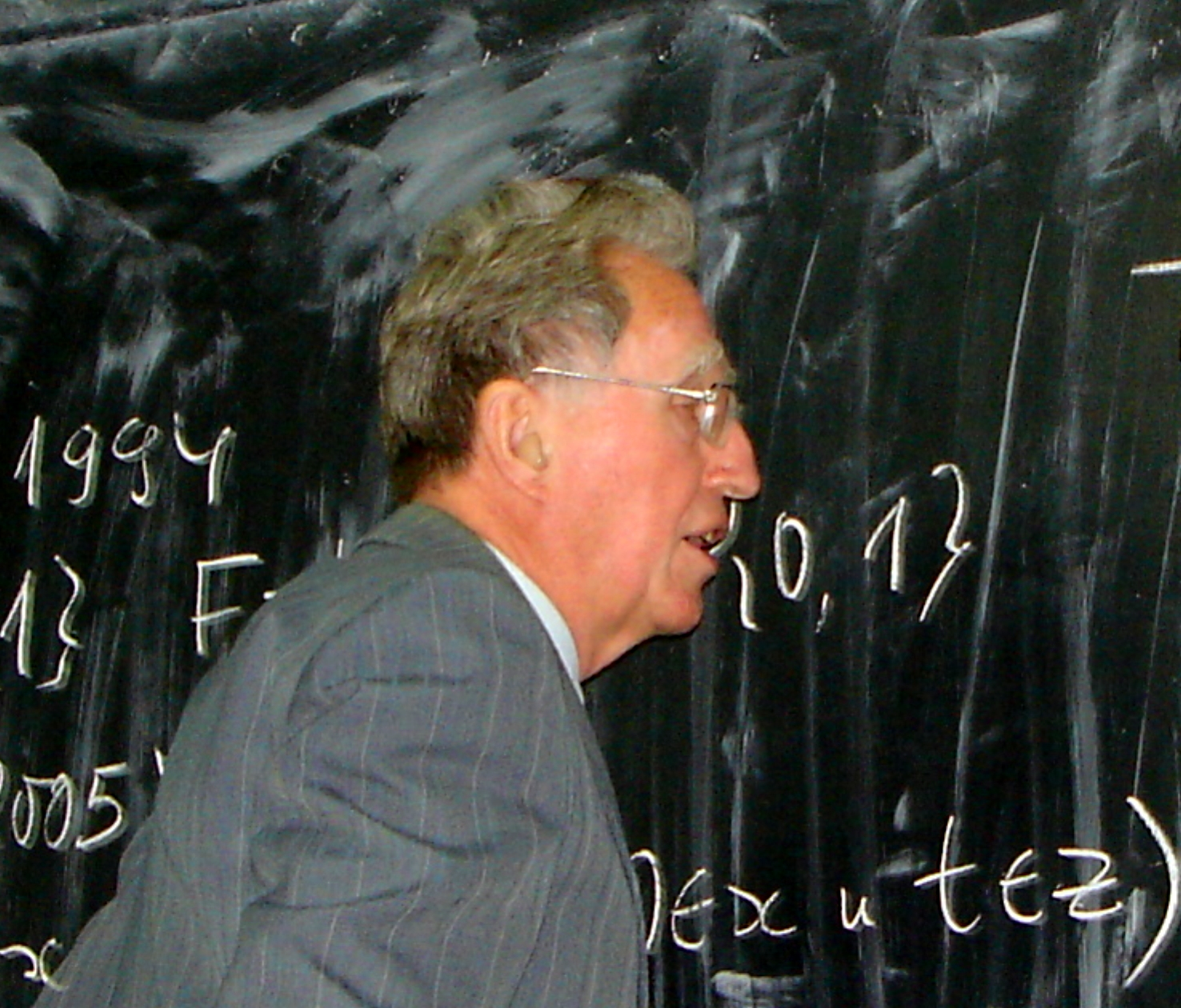
Dimiter Skordev

Dimiter Skordev (Bulgarian: Димитър Скордев) (born 1936 in Sofia) is a professor in the Department of Mathematical Logic and Applications, Faculty of Mathematics and Computer Science at the University of Sofia. Chairman of the department from 1972 to 2000. Doyen and pioneer of mathematical logic research in Bulgaria who developed a Bulgarian school in the theory of computability, namely the algebraic (or axiomatic) recursion theory. He was the 1981 winner of Acad. Nikola Obreshkov Prize, the highest Bulgarian award in mathematics, bestowed for his monograph Combinatory Spaces and Recursiveness in Them.

Skordev's field of scientific interests include computability and complexity in analysis, mathematical logic, generalized recursion theory, and theory of programs and computation.

Skordev has more than 45 years of lecturing experience in calculus, mathematical logic, logic programming, discrete mathematics, and computer science. He has authored about 90 scientific publications including two monographs, and was one of the authors of the new Bulgarian phonetic keyboard layout proposed (but rejected) to become a state standard in 2006.
