= Institute of Mathematics and Informatics =

Bulgarian research institute

Coordinates: 42°40′30.65″N 23°22′6.84″E

Institute's logo

The Institute of Mathematics and Informatics was established in 1947 as Institute of Mathematics at the Bulgarian Academy of Sciences.

Its name changed to Institute of Mathematics with Computing Centre in 1961, while from 1970 to 1988 the Institute together with the Faculty of Mathematics at Sofia University functioned in a unified structure, the Joint Centre of Mathematics and Mechanics. The present name was adopted in 1995.

The Institute carries out scientific research in the fields of mathematics and informatics, as well as their applications to education, science, business and industry, government, etc.

Members of the Institute hold teaching positions at a number of Bulgarian universities and colleges, providing also direction to Ph.D. and M.S. students. The Institute plays an important role in training gifted pupils, graduates, etc. for participating in major international competitions in mathematics and informatics. In particular, the Bulgarian team in mathematics has been ranking among the top five at International Mathematical Olympiad events in the recent years.

== Departments ==
Algebra and Logic (former Algebra and Logic)
Analysis, Geometry and Topology
Differential Equations and Mathematical Physics
Education in Mathematics and Informatics
Information Modelling
Laboratory of Digitization of Scientific and Cultural Heritage
Mathematical Foundations of Informatics
Mathematical Linguistics
Mathematical Modelling and Computational Mathematics
Operation Research,Probability and Statistics
Software Engineering and Informations Systems
Library

== Directors ==
Academician Lyubomir Chakalov, 1947-50
Academician Nikola Obreshkov, 1951-63
Academician Lyubomir Iliev, 1964-88
Academician Petar Kenderov, 1989-93
Sen.Res. Assoc. Nikolay Yanev, 1994-99
Academician Stefan Dodunekov, 1999 – 2012
Academician Julian Revalski 2013-2016
Acadenician Vesselin Drensky 2017-2020
Corr.Member Petar Boyvalenkov 2021-

== Publications ==
- Serdica Mathematical Journal
- Serdica Journal of Computing
- Mathematica Plus
- Fractional Calculus and Applied Analysis
- Pliska Studia Mathematica Bulgarica
- Mathematica Balkanica (founded: New Series, 1987, published quarterly)
- Physico-Mathematical Journal (founded: 1904, published quarterly)

== Applications ==
- The first computing centre in Bulgaria was established at the Institute in 1961.
- The first Bulgarian electronic digital computer Vitosha, and the first Bulgarian electronic calculator Elka were designed and built at the Institute in 1962-64.
- The official Bulgarian system for the Romanization of Cyrillic alphabet was developed at the Institute in 1995, and codified by the Law of Transliteration in 2009.

== Sources ==
- Yanev, Nikolay. (1998). Fifty years of Institute of Mathematics and Informatics at BAS. Journal of BAS, No 3-4, 96-100. (in Bulgarian)
- Andreev A., I. Derzhanski eds. Bulgarian Academy of Sciences: Institute of Mathematics and Informatics, founded 1947. Sofia: Multiprint Ltd., 2007. 64 pp. (Bilingual publication in Bulgarian and English) ISBN 978-954-8986-27-4
