= Dimov Gate =

Location of Livingston Island in the South Shetland Islands.

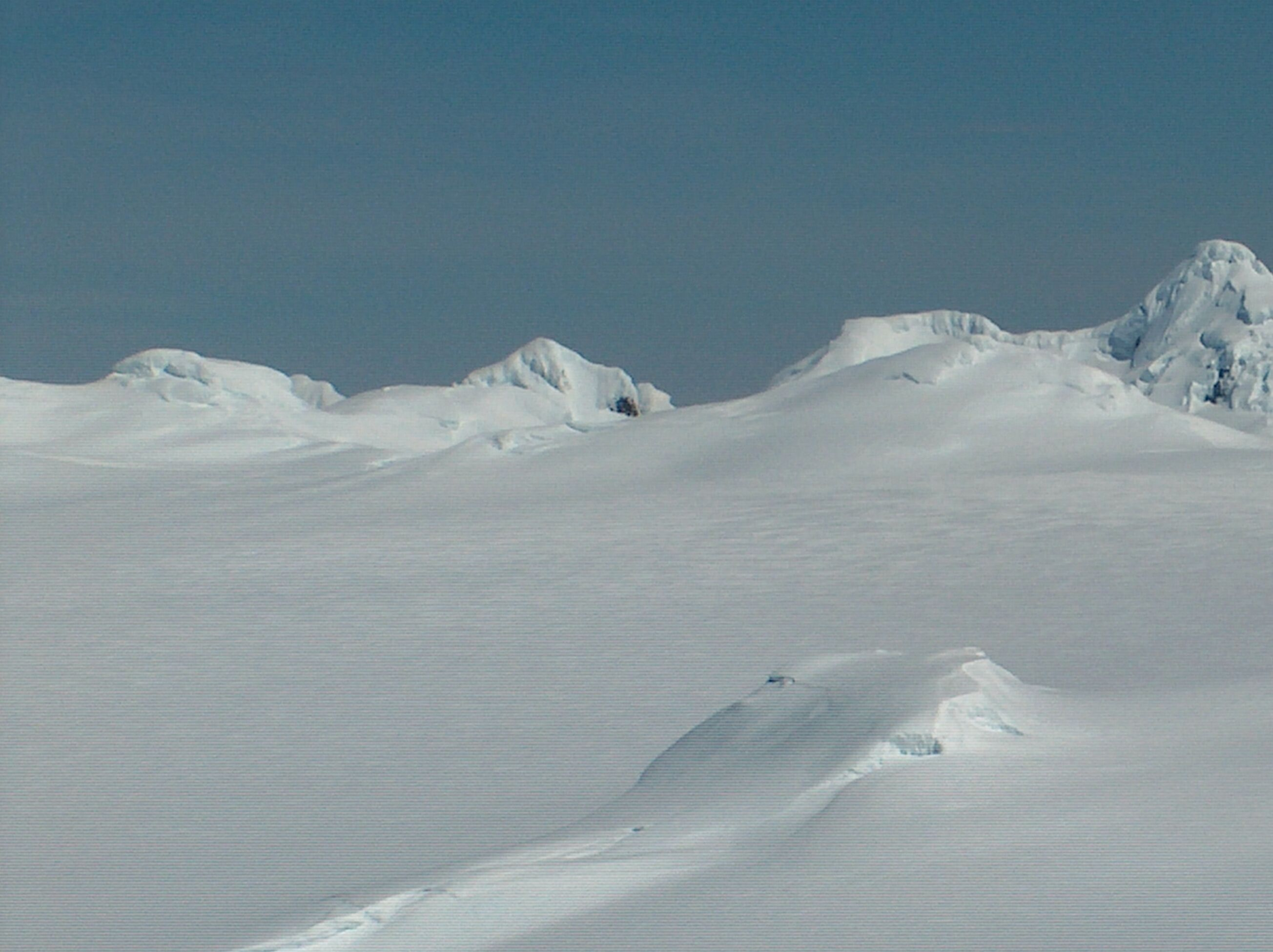
Dimov Gate from Miziya Peak, with Castra Martis Hill in the foreground, and Bowles West Peak and Burdick Peak in the background.

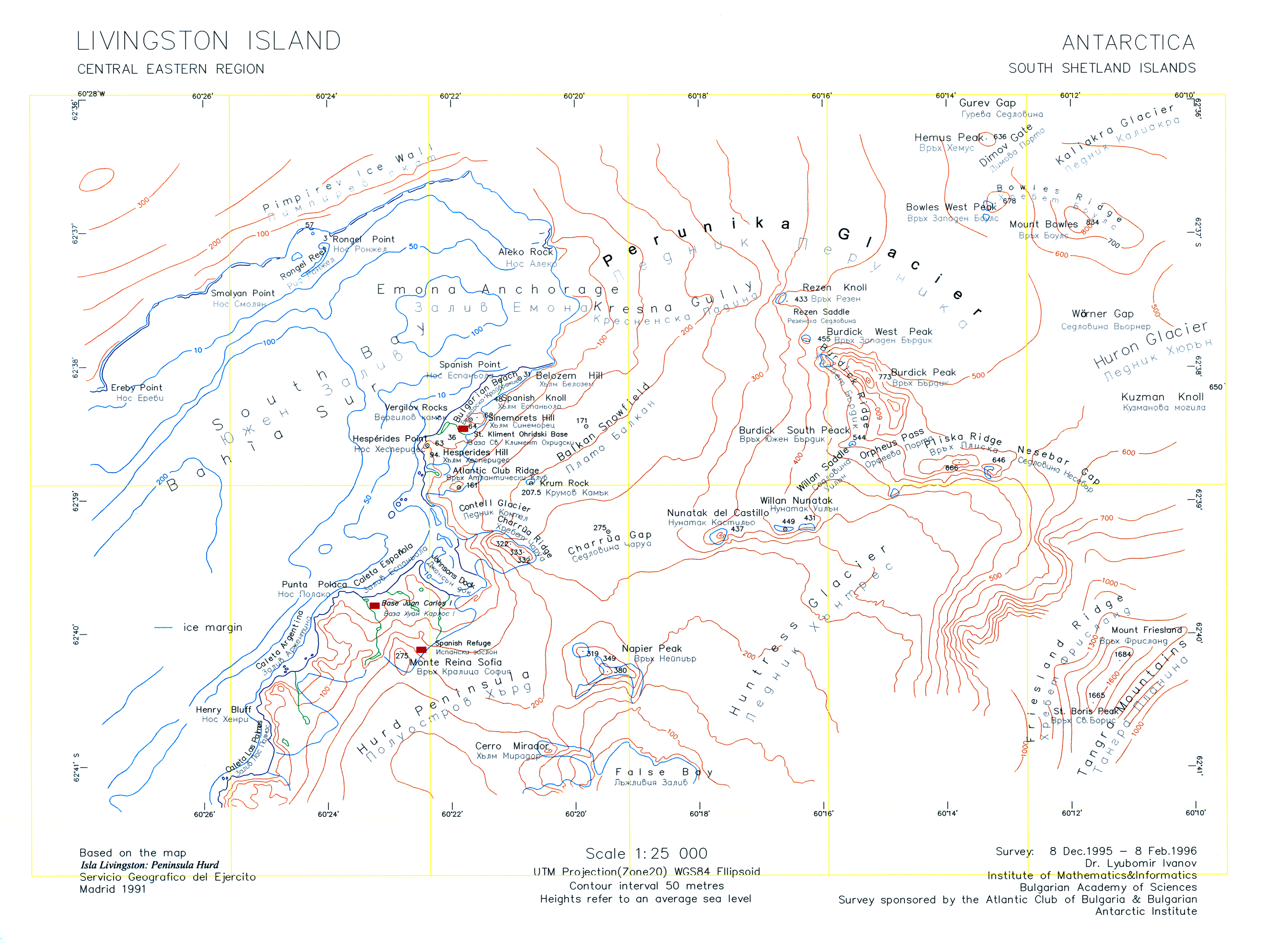
Topographic map of central-eastern Livingston Island featuring Dimov Gate.

Topographic map of Livingston Island, Greenwich, Robert, Snow and Smith Islands.

Dimov Gate (Dimova Porta \'di-mo-va 'por-ta\) is a 300 m wide ice-covered pass in Antarctica, located in eastern Livingston Island in the South Shetland Islands, Antarctica and bounded by Rayna Knyaginya Peak in Bowles Ridge to the southeast and by Hemus Peak to the northwest. The pass separates the glacial catchments of Kaliakra Glacier, and the tributary glacier draining the area between Hemus Peak and Bowles West Peak and flowing west-southwestwards into Perunika Glacier. It affords overland access from Perunika Glacier to the northern slopes of Bowles Ridge and to upper Kaliakra Glacier.

The pass is named after Dimo Dimov, geologist at St. Kliment Ohridski in 1994/95 and subsequent seasons, who was the first postmaster of the post office Antarctica 1090 operated at the base since the 1994/95 season in compliance with standard Bulgarian postal regulations and procedures.

== Location ==
The midpoint is located at 62°36′27″S 60°12′50″W which is 3.86 km northeast by south of Rezen Knoll, 1.34 km west-northwest of Mount Bowles, 2.6 km west of Yankov Gap and 3.87 km south of Elhovo Gap. (UK Directorate of Overseas Surveys mapping in 1968, Spanish mapping in 1991, and Bulgarian in 2005 and 2009. Co-ordinates, elevation and distances given according to a 1995-96 Bulgarian topographic survey.

== Maps ==
- L.L. Ivanov. Livingston Island: Central-Eastern Region. Scale 1:25000 topographic map. Sofia: Antarctic Place-names Commission of Bulgaria, 1996.
- S. Soccol, D. Gildea and J. Bath. Livingston Island, Antarctica. Scale 1:100000 satellite map. The Omega Foundation, USA, 2004.
- L.L. Ivanov et al., Antarctica: Livingston Island and Greenwich Island, South Shetland Islands (from English Strait to Morton Strait, with illustrations and ice-cover distribution), 1:100000 scale topographic map, Antarctic Place-names Commission of Bulgaria, Sofia, 2005
- L.L. Ivanov. Antarctica: Livingston Island and Greenwich, Robert, Snow and Smith Islands. Scale 1:120000 topographic map. Troyan: Manfred Wörner Foundation, 2010. ISBN 978-954-92032-9-5 (First edition 2009. ISBN 978-954-92032-6-4)
- Antarctic Digital Database (ADD). Scale 1:250000 topographic map of Antarctica. Scientific Committee on Antarctic Research (SCAR). Since 1993, regularly upgraded and updated.
- A. Kamburov and L. Ivanov. Bowles Ridge and Central Tangra Mountains: Livingston Island, Antarctica. Scale 1:25000 map. Sofia: Manfred Wörner Foundation, 2023. ISBN 978-619-90008-6-1
