= Rayna Knyaginya Peak =

Peak of elevation in the South Shetland Islands, Antarctica

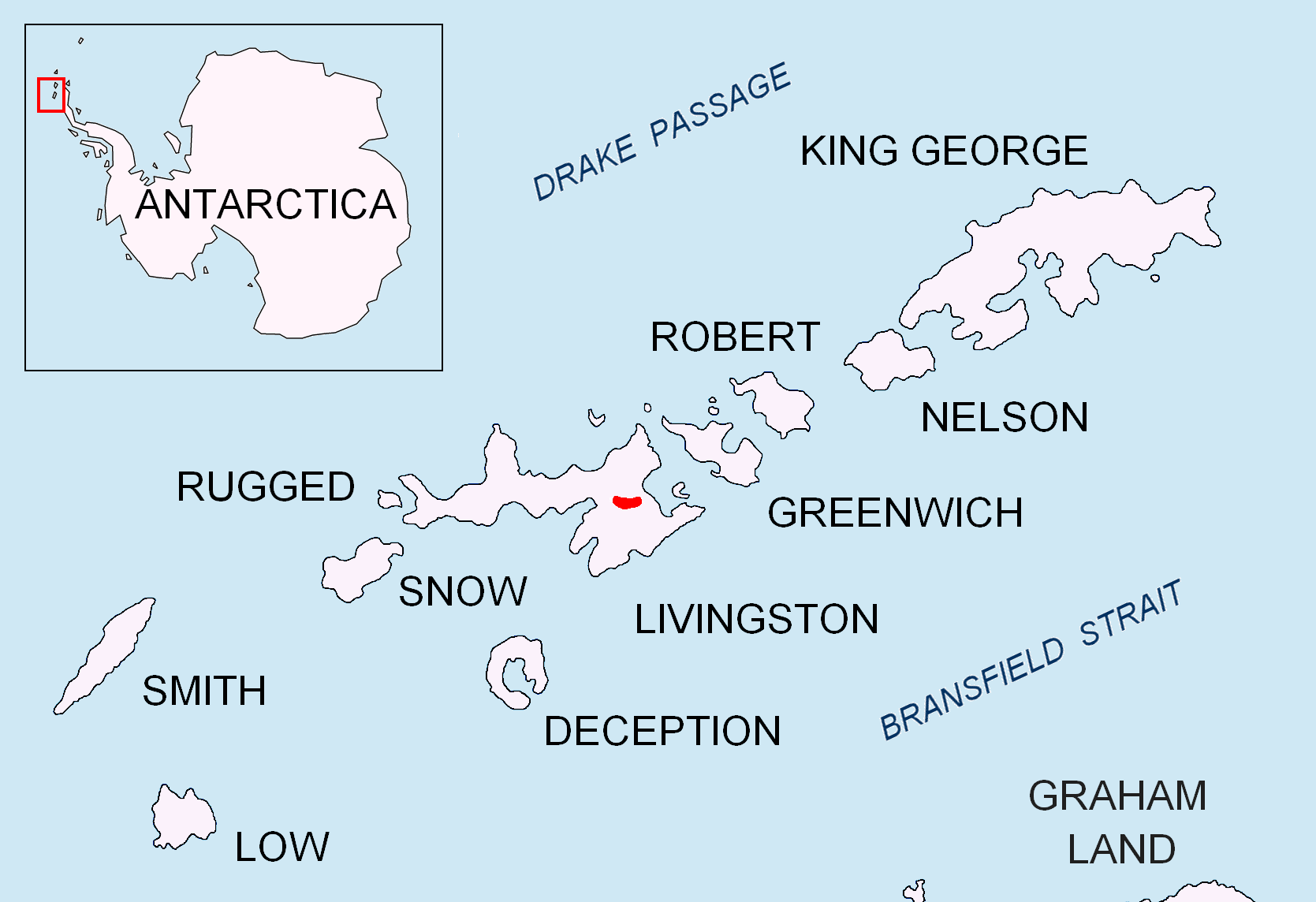
Location of Bowles Ridge on Livingston Island in the South Shetland Islands.

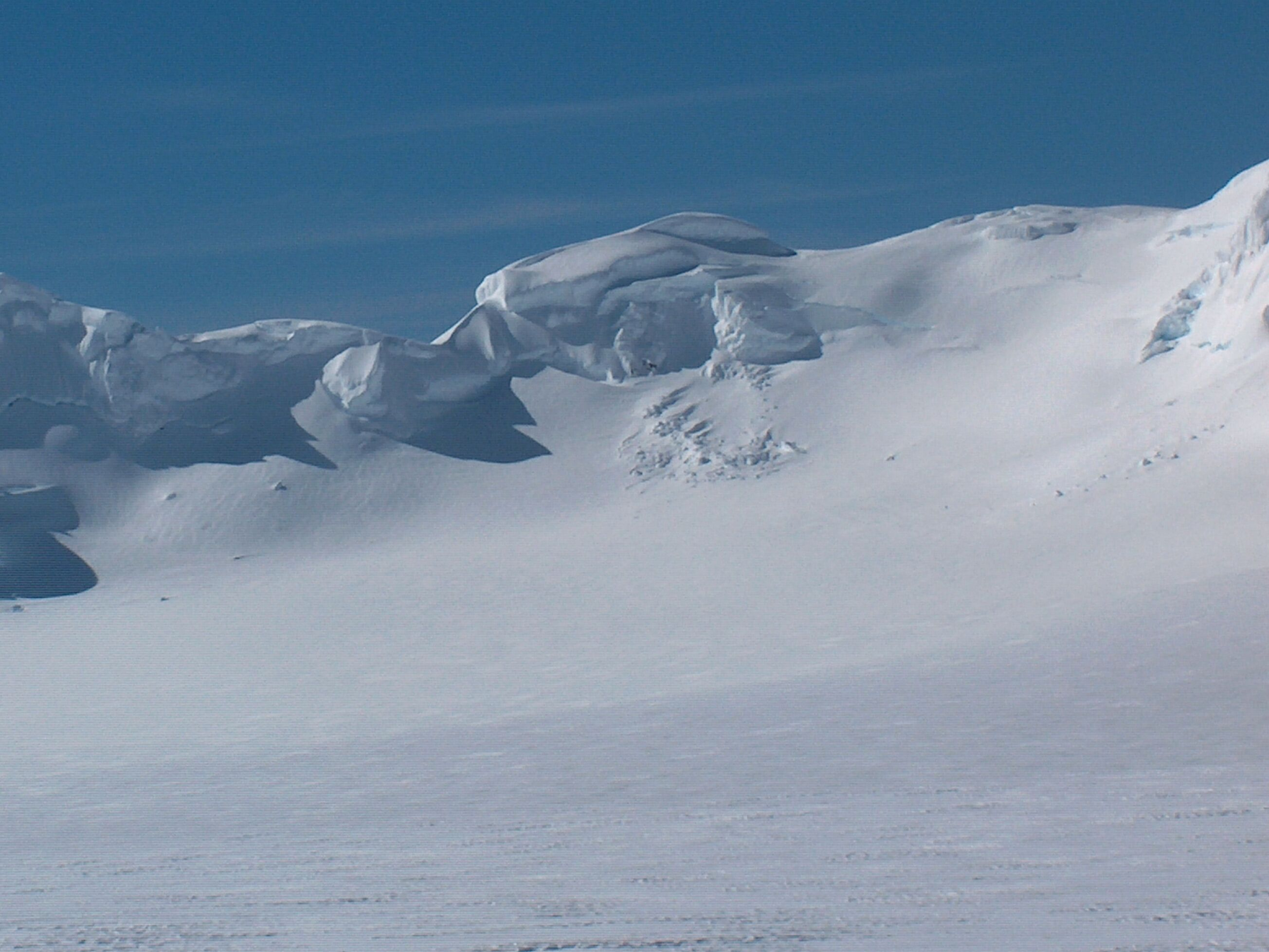
Rayna Knyaginya Peak from Orpheus Gate.

Topographic map of Livingston Island and Smith Island.

Rayna Knyaginya Peak (Bulgarian: връх Райна Княгиня, romanized: vrah Rayna Knyaginya, IPA: [ˈvrɤx ˈrajnɐ kɲɐˈɡiɲɐ]) is a peak of elevation 680 m in western Bowles Ridge, Livingston Island in the South Shetland Islands, Antarctica. Surmounting Perunika Glacier to the south and northwest, and Kaliakra Glacier to the northeast.

The peak is named after Rayna Knyaginya (pseudonym of Rayna Futekova, 1856–1917), heroine of the Bulgarian liberation movement.

== Location ==
The peak is located at 62°36′45″S 60°12′49″W, which is 740 m northwest of the summit Mount Bowles, 350 m east by north of Bowles West Peak, and 800 m southeast of Hemus Peak from which it is separated by Dimov Gate (Bulgarian topographic survey Tangra 2004/05, and mapping in 2005 and 2009).

== Maps ==
- L.L. Ivanov et al. Antarctica: Livingston Island and Greenwich Island, South Shetland Islands. Scale 1:100000 topographic map. Sofia: Antarctic Place-names Commission of Bulgaria, 2005.
- L.L. Ivanov. Antarctica: Livingston Island and Greenwich, Robert, Snow and Smith Islands. Scale 1:120000 topographic map. Troyan: Manfred Wörner Foundation, 2009. ISBN 978-954-92032-6-4
- Antarctic Digital Database (ADD). Scale 1:250000 topographic map of Antarctica. Scientific Committee on Antarctic Research (SCAR). Since 1993, regularly upgraded and updated.
- L.L. Ivanov. Antarctica: Livingston Island and Smith Island. Scale 1:100000 topographic map. Manfred Wörner Foundation, 2017. ISBN 978-619-90008-3-0
- A. Kamburov and L. Ivanov. Bowles Ridge and Central Tangra Mountains: Livingston Island, Antarctica. Scale 1:25000 map. Sofia: Manfred Wörner Foundation, 2023. ISBN 978-619-90008-6-1
