= Beroe Hill =

Location of Livingston Island in the South Shetland Islands

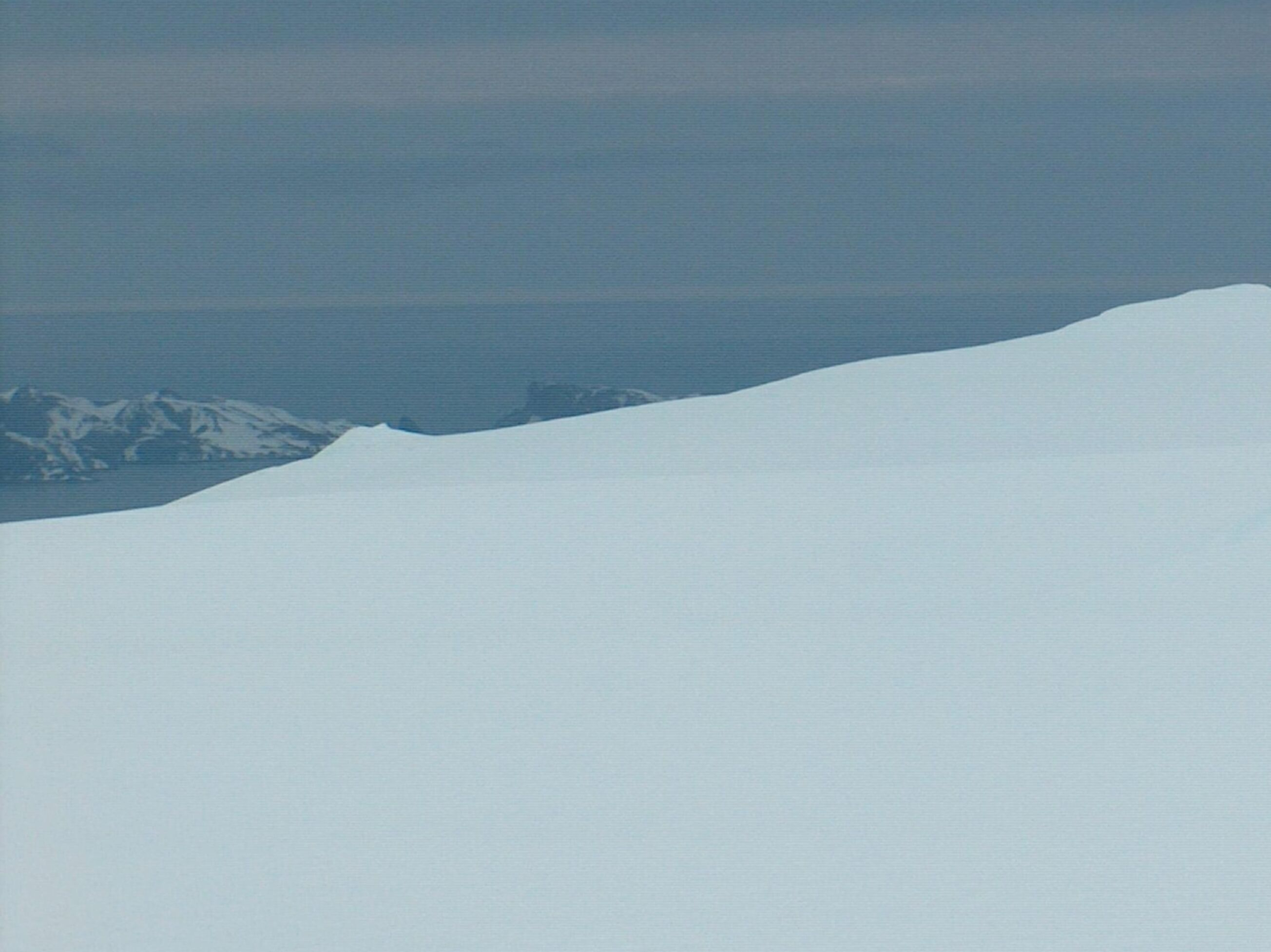
Beroe Hill

Topographic map of Livingston Island and Smith Islands

Beroe Hill (Halm Beroe \'h&lm be-'ro-e\) is a hill of 400 m in the southwest extremity of Gleaner Heights, Livingston Island, West Antarctica. It is surmounting Perunika Glacier to the south and Saedinenie Snowfield to the northwest. The hill was named after the ancient Thracian town of Beroe, ancestor of the present city of Stara Zagora.

== Location ==
The hill is located at 62°35′04″S 60°15′29″W which is 1.9 km southwest of the summit of the heights, 4.7 km north-northeast of Rezen Knoll and 3 km northwest of Hemus Peak.

Bulgarian mapping in 2005, 2009 and 2017 from the Tangra 2004/05 topographic survey.

== Maps ==
- L.L. Ivanov et al. Antarctica: Livingston Island and Greenwich Island, South Shetland Islands. Scale 1:100000 topographic map. Sofia: Antarctic Place-names Commission of Bulgaria, 2005.
- L.L. Ivanov. Antarctica: Livingston Island and Greenwich, Robert, Snow and Smith Islands. Scale 1:120000 topographic map. Troyan: Manfred Wörner Foundation, 2009.
- A. Kamburov and L. Ivanov. Bowles Ridge and Central Tangra Mountains: Livingston Island, Antarctica. Scale 1:25000 map. Sofia: Manfred Wörner Foundation, 2023. ISBN 978-619-90008-6-1
