= Aleksandar Vutimski =

- Александър Вутимски
- Born: Aleksandar Kotsev Vutov; 30 July 1919; Svoge, Bulgaria
- Died: 23 September 1943 (aged 24); Surdulica, German-Occupied Serbia
- Occupations: Poet, essayist, prose writer
- Writing career
- Pen name: Aleksandar Vutimski, Al. Vutov, Al. Kotsev, Al. Vulkanov
- Language: Bulgarian
- Genres: Poetry, essays, prose

Aleksandar Vutimski (Bulgarian: Александър Вутимски; sometimes rendered in English as Alexander Vutimski; born Aleksandar Kotsev Vutov) was a Bulgarian poet, essayist, and prose writer. He is regarded as one of the first Bulgarian authors to explore homosexual themes and aesthetics in Bulgarian poetry.

== Biography ==
Vutimski was born in Svoge and lived there until the age of ten. After losing his mother, father, and two brothers to tuberculosis within the span of a single year, he moved to Sofia. He initially lived with his sister, who also died of tuberculosis in 1937, and later with his only surviving brother, Kiril.

According to literary researcher Kaloyan Pramatarov, Vutimski wandered Sofia's streets at night, frequented pubs and parties with friends, and lived a largely bohemian existence shaped by illness, alienation, and urban life. Pramatarov also described Vutimski as being "boldly and openly gay during World War II," despite Bulgaria's alliance with Nazi Germany.

In 1937, he graduated from the First Sofia Boys' High School. In 1938, he enrolled in the study of classical philology at Sofia University, but contracted tuberculosis and was forced to discontinue his studies after one year. Between 1939 and 1943, he contributed to the literary magazine Zlatorog. He underwent treatment in various sanatoriums throughout Bulgaria without success and, beginning in the spring of 1941, stayed at the sanatorium in Surdulica. He died on 23 September 1943.

== Literary career ==
Vutimski's first published poem was Pak Samichko ("Again Alone"), published in 1935 in the newspaper Vesela Druzhina. His first major poetic debut came with the poem Ulitsata ("The Street").

He participated alongside Alexander Gerov and others in the literary collections Prag (1938) and Zhazhda (1939). He also published in various magazines and newspapers under the pseudonyms:

- Al. Vutov
- Al. Kotsev
- Al. Vulkanov

Beginning in May 1939, he became a regular contributor to Zlatorog, edited by Vladimir Vassilev, where many of his most mature poems were published under the name Aleksandar Vutimski.

Vutimski is considered one of the earliest Bulgarian poets to openly incorporate homosexual themes and aesthetics into his literary work.

== Unpublished works ==
Vutimski did not succeed in publishing a poetry collection during his lifetime. His prose also remained unpublished, surviving only in typed manuscript copies. Among these were 15 short essays written between 1941 and 1943, including:

- On Simplicity
- On Strength
- On Money
- On Joy
- On Beauty
- On Equality
- On the Most Humble

His collected works were later compiled and published by Aleksandar Petrunov.

In 2020, the bilingual Bulgarian–Spanish edition El muchacho azul / Синьото момче ("The Blue Boy") was published, featuring Spanish translations by Marco Vidal.
