= Chirpan Peak =

Mountain in the South Shetland Islands, Antarctica

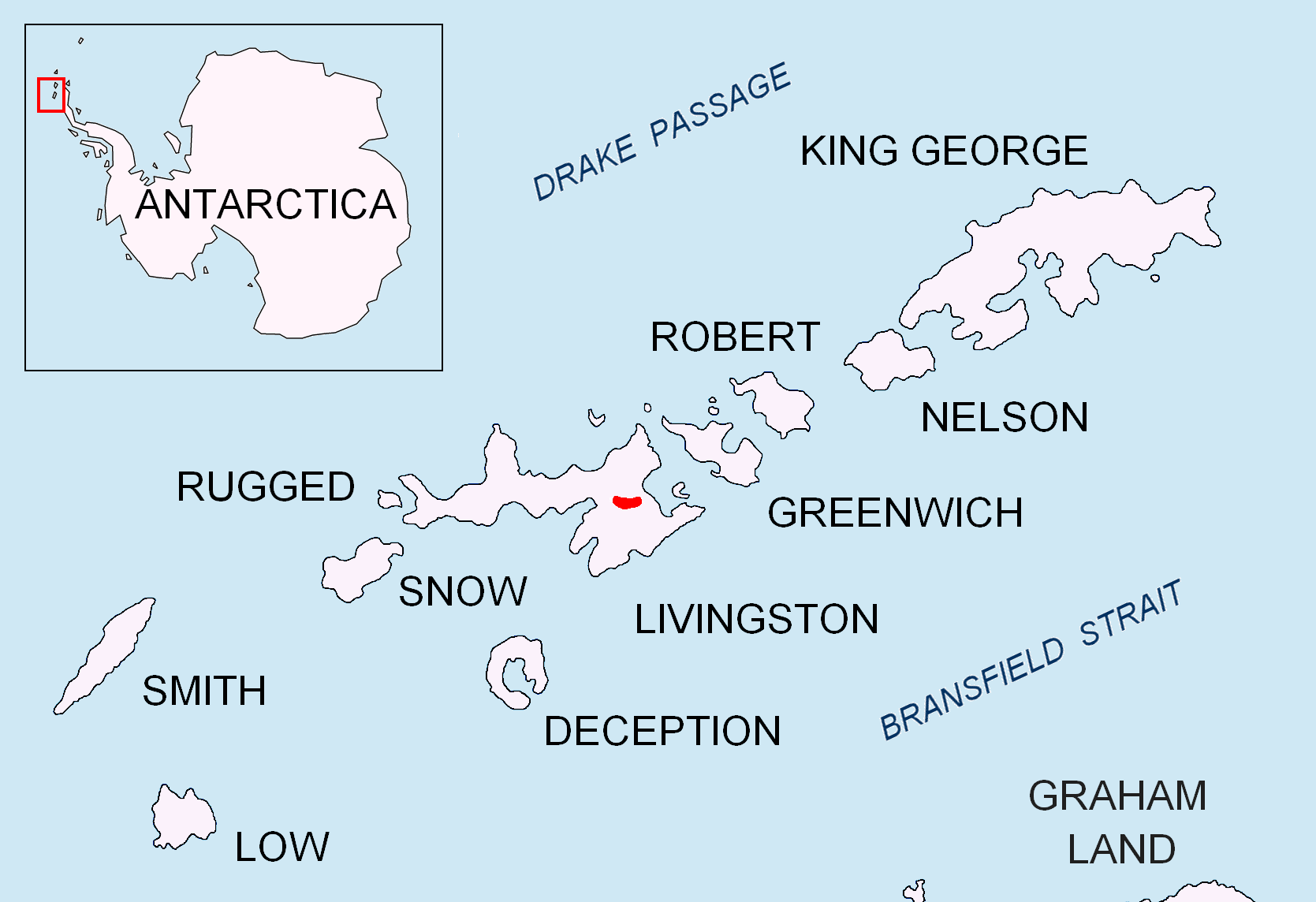
Location of Bowles Ridge on Livingston Island in the South Shetland Islands

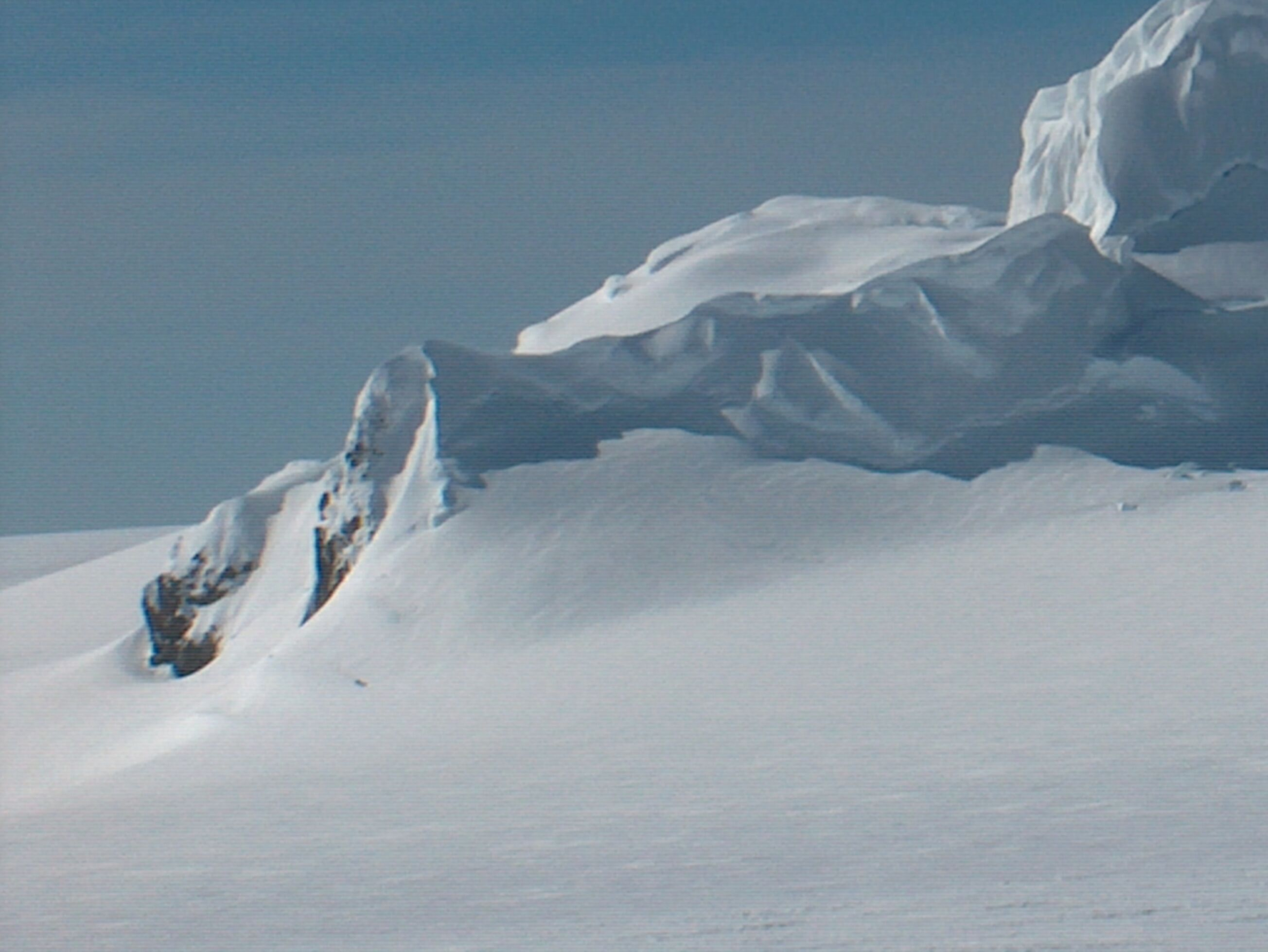
Chirpan Peak from Orpheus Gate

Topographic map of Livingston Island, Greenwich, Robert, Snow and Smith Islands

Chirpan Peak (Bulgarian: връх Чирпан, romanized: vrah Chirpan, IPA: [ˈvrɤx t͡ʃirˈpan]) is an ice-covered 535 metres (1,755 ft) peak forming the western extremity of Bowles Ridge on Livingston Island in the South Shetland Islands, Antarctica overlooking Perunika Glacier to the west and south. The peak is named after the town of Chirpan in southern Bulgaria

== Location ==
The peak is located at 62°36′53.5″S 60°13′34″W which is 1.23 kilometres (0.76 mi) west of the summit Mount Bowles, 1.01 kilometres (0.63 mi) south-southwest of Hemus Peak, 2.85 kilometres (1.77 mi) east-northeast of Rezen Knoll and 1.12 kilometres (0.70 mi) northwest of Svoge Knoll.

Bulgarian mapping in 2005 and 2009 from the Tangra 2004/05 topographic survey.

== Maps ==
- L.L. Ivanov et al. Antarctica: Livingston Island and Greenwich Island, South Shetland Islands. Scale 1:100000 topographic map. Sofia: Antarctic Place-names Commission of Bulgaria, 2005.
- L.L. Ivanov. Antarctica: Livingston Island and Greenwich, Robert, Snow and Smith Islands. Scale 1:120000 topographic map. Troyan: Manfred Wörner Foundation, 2009. ISBN 978-954-92032-6-4
- A. Kamburov and L. Ivanov. Bowles Ridge and Central Tangra Mountains: Livingston Island, Antarctica. Scale 1:25000 map. Sofia: Manfred Wörner Foundation, 2023. ISBN 978-619-90008-6-1
