= Gleaner Heights =

In the South Shetland Islands, Antarctica

Location of Livingston Island in the South Shetland Islands

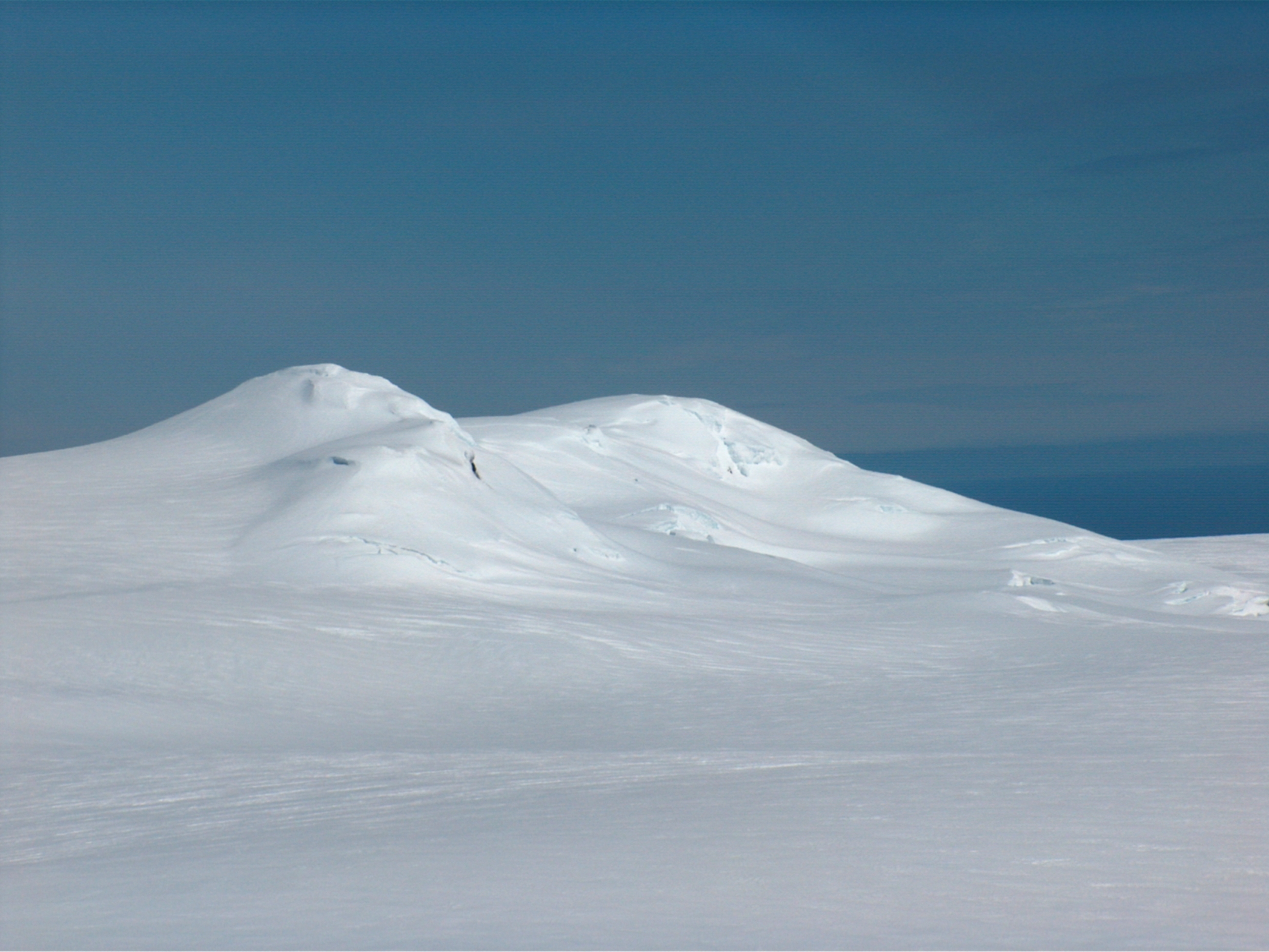
Gleaner Heights from Miziya Peak

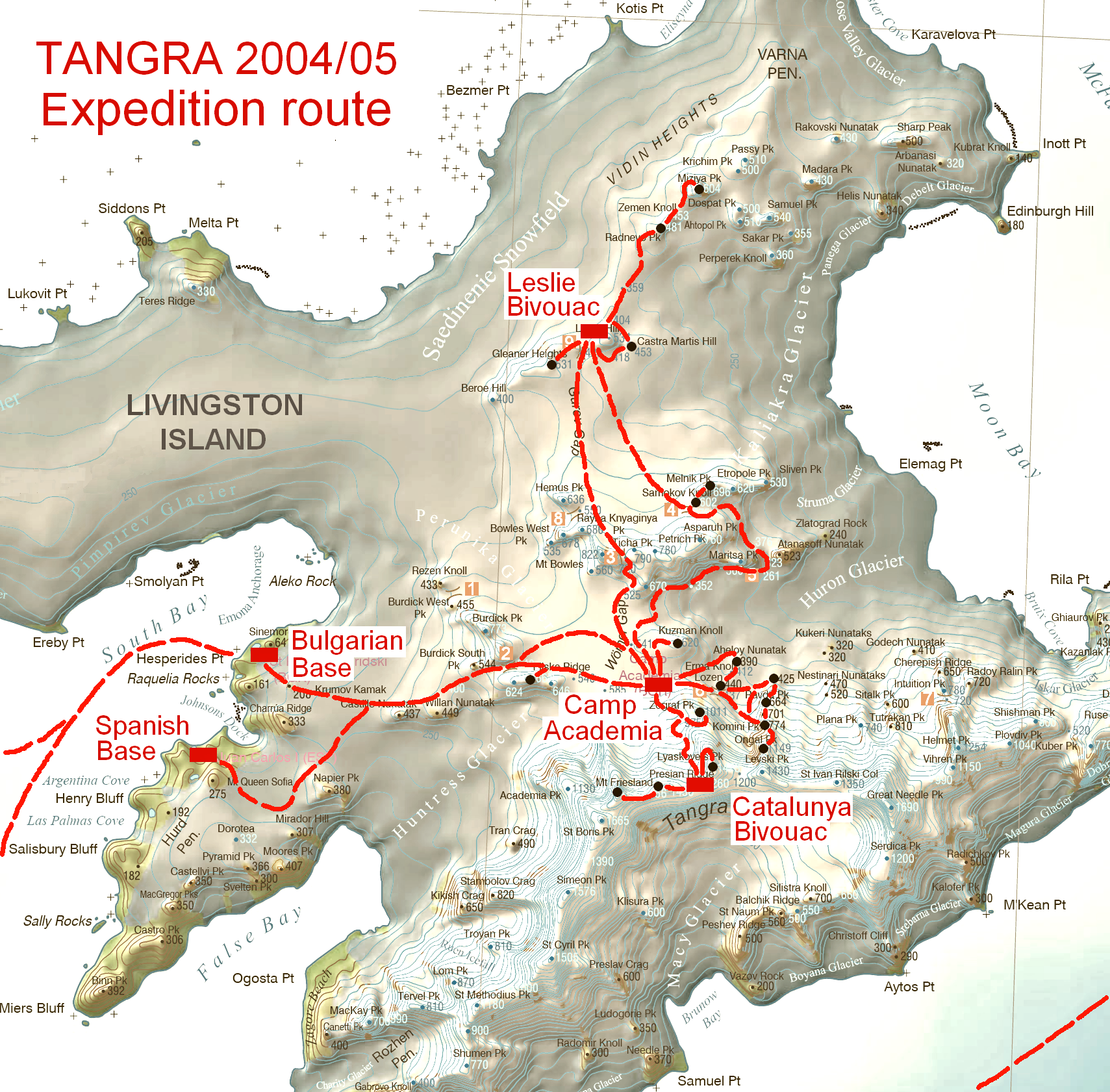
The survey route of Tangra 2004/05 including Gleaner Heights

Topographic map of Livingston Island and Smith Island

The Gleaner Heights are a series of elevations extending for 2 km (1.2 mi) southwest from Leslie Hill in the eastern part of Livingston Island in the South Shetland Islands, Antarctica. They are separated from Leslie Hill by Elhovo Gap, and from Hemus Peak off the northwest extremity of Bowles Ridge by Gurev Gap. The feature is heavily glaciated, with a small rock exposure on its northwest slopes. Gleaner Heights surmount Saedinenie Snowfield to the northwest, Kaliakra Glacier to the east and Perunika Glacier to the southwest. The first ascent was by the Bulgarian Doychin Vasilev from Camp Academia on 25 December 2004, as part of Tangra 2004/05 survey.

The heights were named by the UK Antarctic Place-names Committee in 1958 after the American brig Gleaner from New Bedford, which was diverted to sealing in the South Shetland Islands in 1820–21.

== Location ==
The summit of the heights rising to 531 metres (1,742 ft) is located at 62°34′25″S 60°13′50″W, which is 5 kilometres (3 mi) north by west of Mount Bowles, 5.05 kilometres (3.14 mi) northwest of Melnik Peak and 1.43 kilometres (0.89 mi) west-southwest of Leslie Hill. British mapping in 1968, and Bulgarian in 2005, 2009 and 2017).

== See also ==
- Beroe Hill

== Maps ==
- L.L. Ivanov et al. Antarctica: Livingston Island and Greenwich Island, South Shetland Islands (from English Strait to Morton Strait, with illustrations and ice-cover distribution). Scale 1:100000 topographic map. Sofia: Antarctic Place-names Commission of Bulgaria, 2005.
- L.L. Ivanov. Antarctica: Livingston Island and Greenwich, Robert, Snow and Smith Islands. Scale 1:120000 topographic map. Troyan: Manfred Wörner Foundation, 2009. ISBN 978-954-92032-6-4
- L.L. Ivanov. Antarctica: Livingston Island and Smith Island. Scale 1:100000 topographic map. Manfred Wörner Foundation, 2017. ISBN 978-619-90008-3-0
- Antarctic Digital Database (ADD). Scale 1:250000 topographic map of Antarctica. Scientific Committee on Antarctic Research (SCAR). Since 1993, regularly upgraded and updated.
- A. Kamburov and L. Ivanov. Bowles Ridge and Central Tangra Mountains: Livingston Island, Antarctica. Scale 1:25000 map. Sofia: Manfred Wörner Foundation, 2023. ISBN 978-619-90008-6-1
