= Svoge Knoll =

Peak in the South Shetland Islands, Antarctica

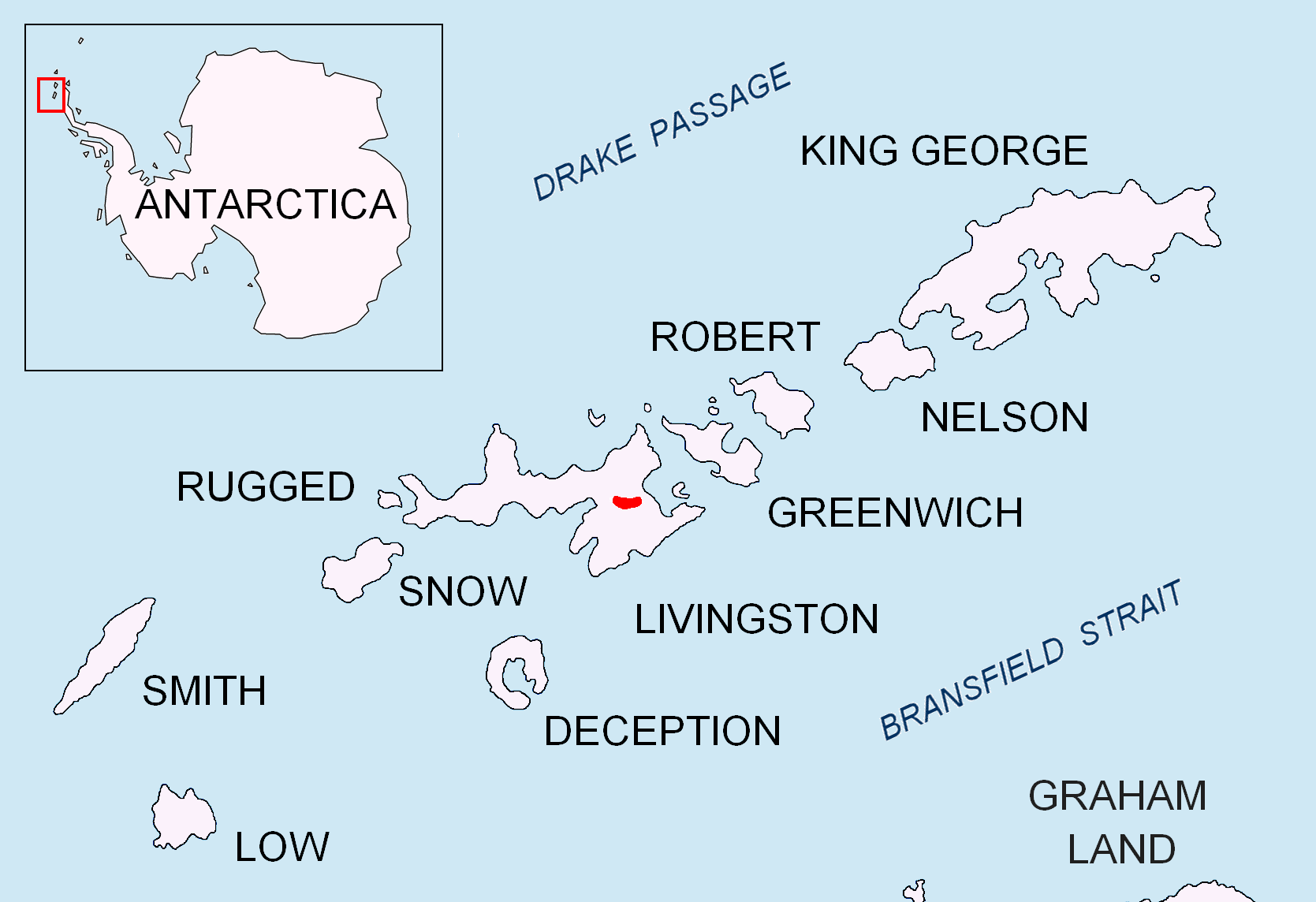
Location of Bowles Ridge on Livingston Island in the South Shetland Islands

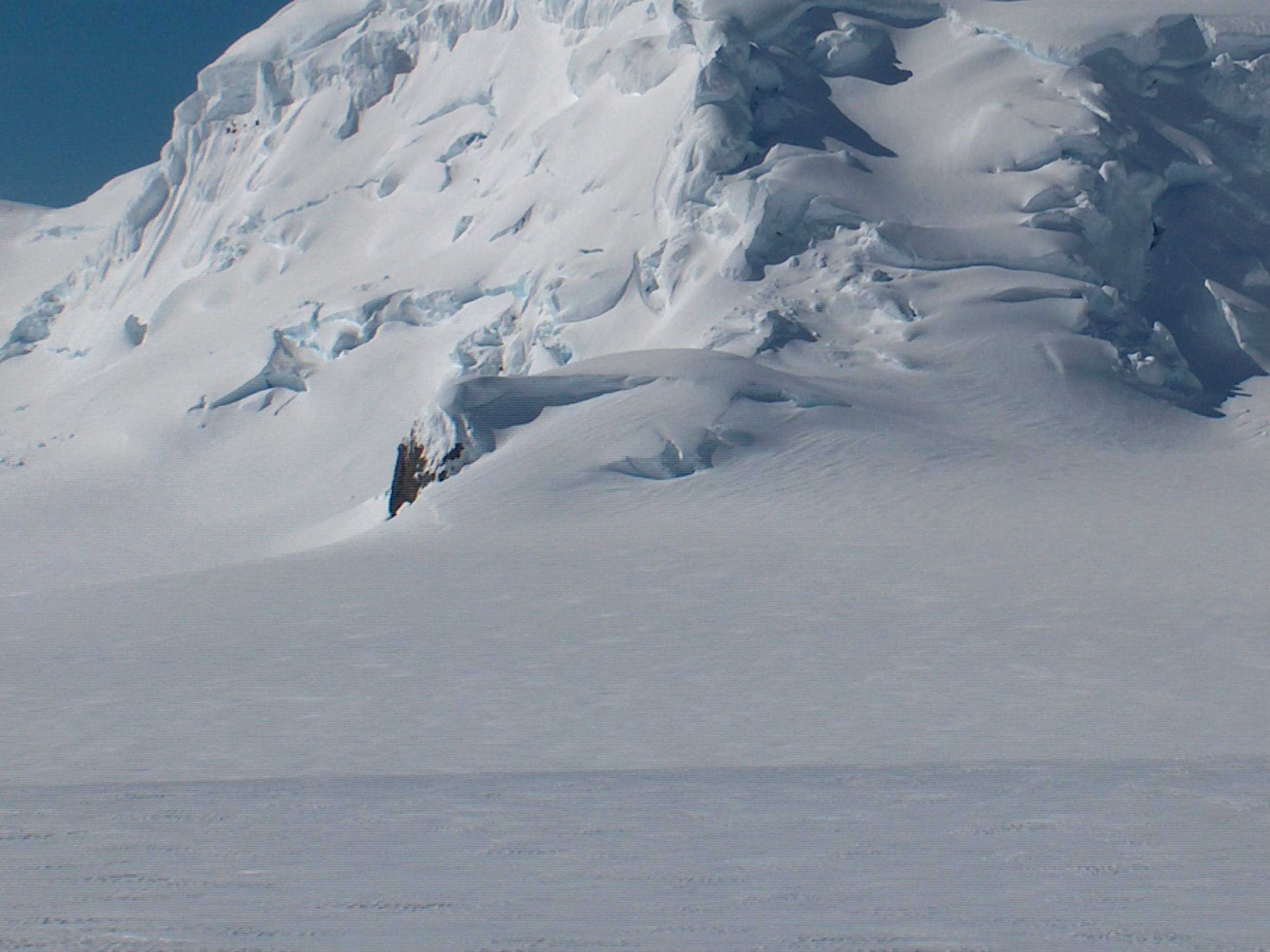
Svoge Knoll from the northern foothills of Pliska Ridge

Topographic map of Livingston Island and Smith Island

Svoge Knoll (Svogenska Mogila \'svo-gen-ska mo-'gi-la\) is an ice-covered peak rising to 560 m in Bowles Ridge, Livingston Island in the South Shetland Islands, Antarctica. Surmounting Perunika Glacier to the south and west.

The knoll is named after the town of Svoge in the western Balkan Mountains, Bulgaria.

== Location ==
The knoll is located at 62°37′14″S 60°12′29″W, which is 620 m southwest of Mount Bowles, 3.1 km northeast of Orpheus Gate, 3.57 km east by north of Rezen Knoll and 1.12 km southeast of Chirpan Peak (Bulgarian topographic survey Tangra 2004/05).

== Maps ==
- L.L. Ivanov et al. Antarctica: Livingston Island and Greenwich Island, South Shetland Islands. Scale 1:100000 topographic map. Sofia: Antarctic Place-names Commission of Bulgaria, 2005.
- L.L. Ivanov. Antarctica: Livingston Island and Greenwich, Robert, Snow and Smith Islands. Scale 1:120000 topographic map. Troyan: Manfred Wörner Foundation, 2010. ISBN 978-954-92032-9-5 (First edition 2009. ISBN 978-954-92032-6-4)
- Antarctic Digital Database (ADD). Scale 1:250000 topographic map of Antarctica. Scientific Committee on Antarctic Research (SCAR). Since 1993, regularly upgraded and updated.
- L.L. Ivanov. Antarctica: Livingston Island and Smith Island. Scale 1:100000 topographic map. Manfred Wörner Foundation, 2017. ISBN 978-619-90008-3-0
- A. Kamburov and L. Ivanov. Bowles Ridge and Central Tangra Mountains: Livingston Island, Antarctica. Scale 1:25000 map. Sofia: Manfred Wörner Foundation, 2023. ISBN 978-619-90008-6-1
