= Svoge =

Svoge Своге
- Town
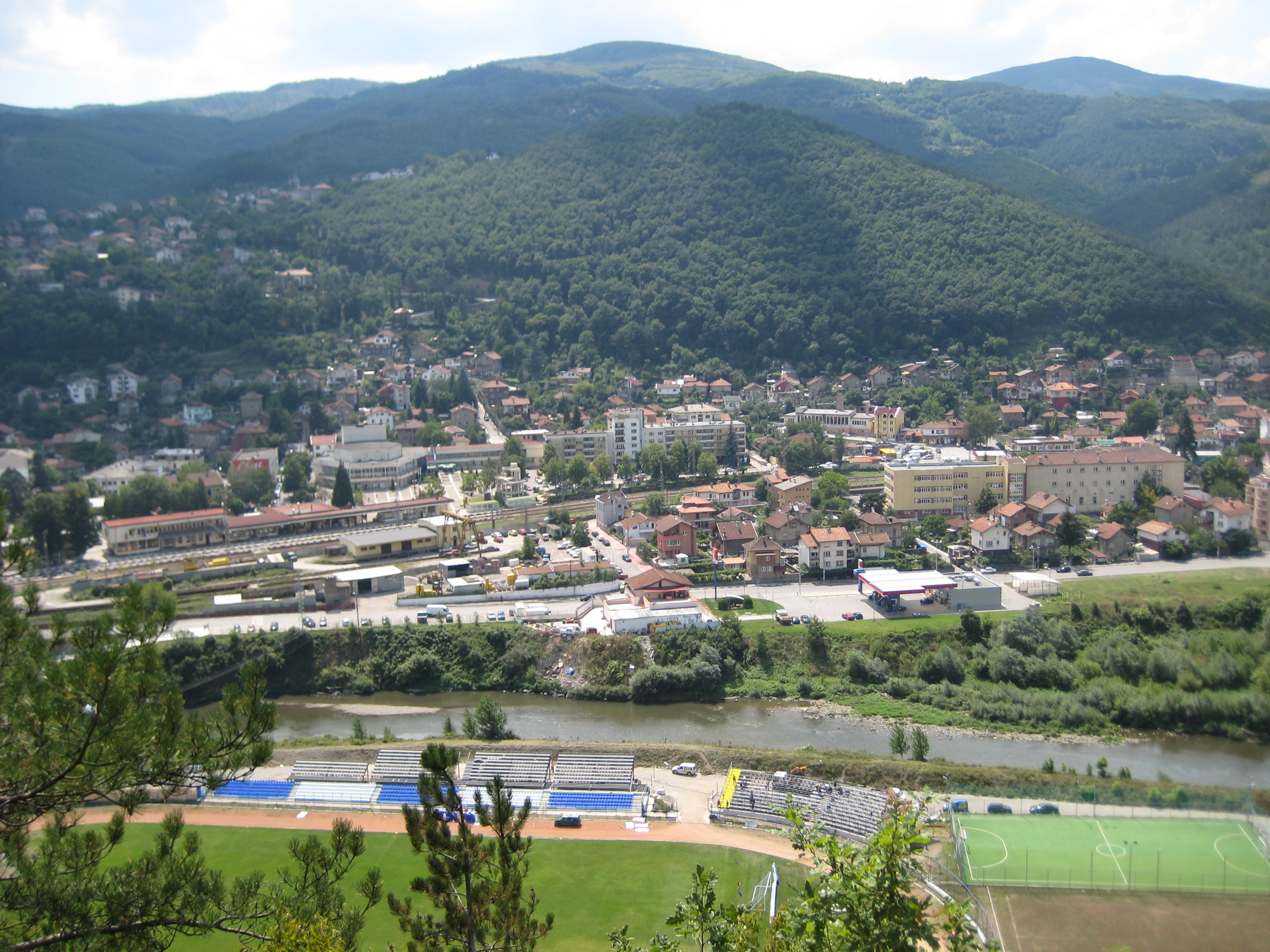
- View from the "Three Pines" area

- Coat of arms

- Location of Svoge within Bulgaria
- Coordinates: 42°58′N 23°21′E
- Country: Bulgaria
- Province: Sofia
- Municipality: Svoge

Government
  - Mayor: Emil Ivanov

Area
  - Total: 21,932 km^{2} (8,468 sq mi)
- Elevation: 679 m (2,228 ft)

Population (2015)
  - Total: 8,258
  - Density: 0.3765/km^{2} (0.9752/sq mi)
- Postal code: 2260

Svoge (Bulgarian: Своге, [ˈsfɔɡɛ]) is a town in western Bulgaria, part of Sofia Province. It is located in the gorge of the Iskar River, at the place where the mountains Mala planina, Golema planina, and Ponor meet, 40 km north of the capital Sofia. Svoge is the main town of the Svoge Municipality which is one of the largest municipalities in Bulgaria and includes also 37 villages & the town of Svoge itself. By Decree No. 546 of the Presidium of the National Assembly on 7 September 1964 Svoge was declared as a city.

== Etymology ==
Svoge's name comes from the Bulgarian word svod (свод), meaning "vault, arch", due to the town's location as a vault where the rivers Iskar and Iskretska meet. In the local vernacular, svod got transformed to svoge.

== Honour ==
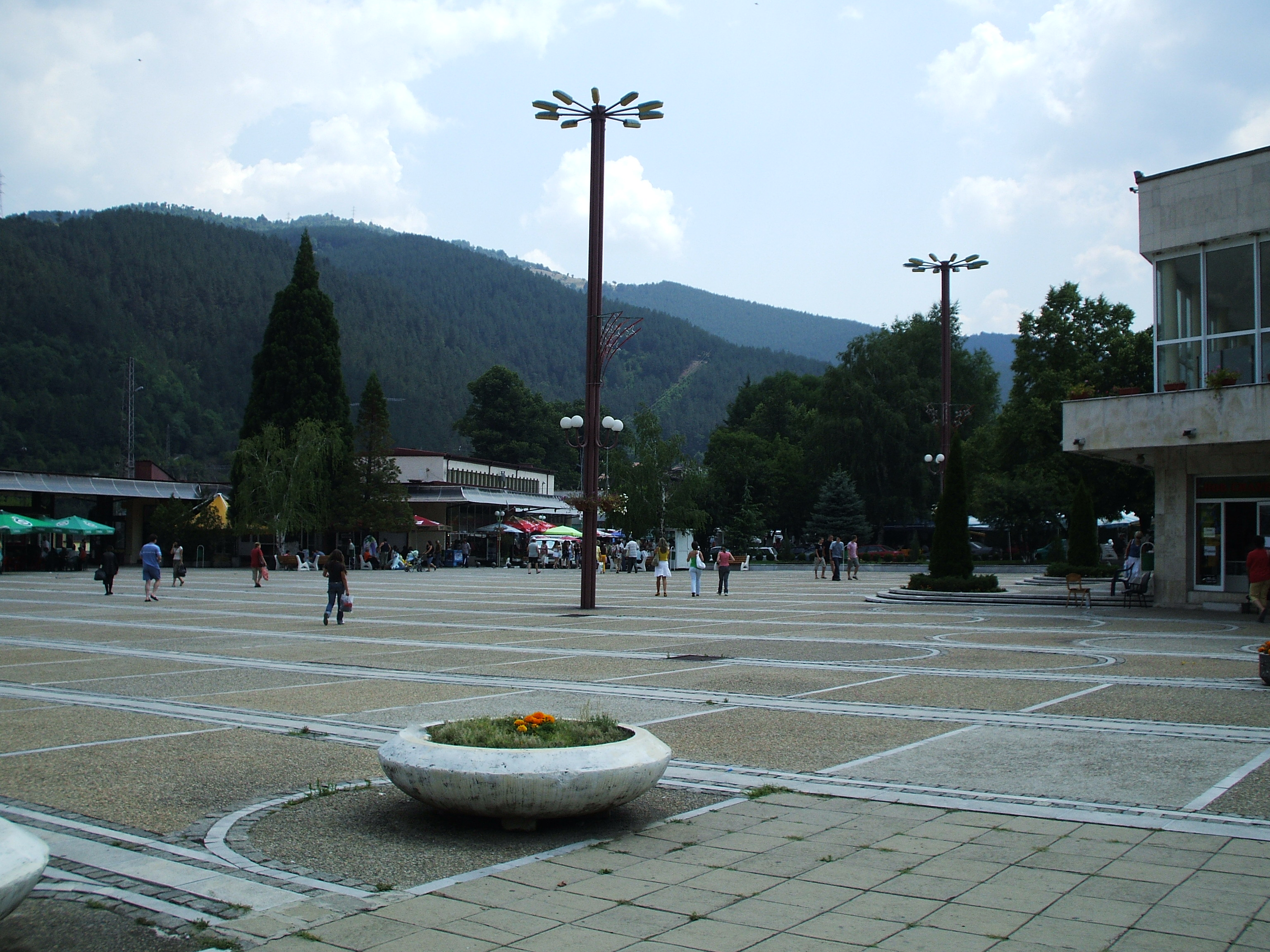
Svoge Central Square

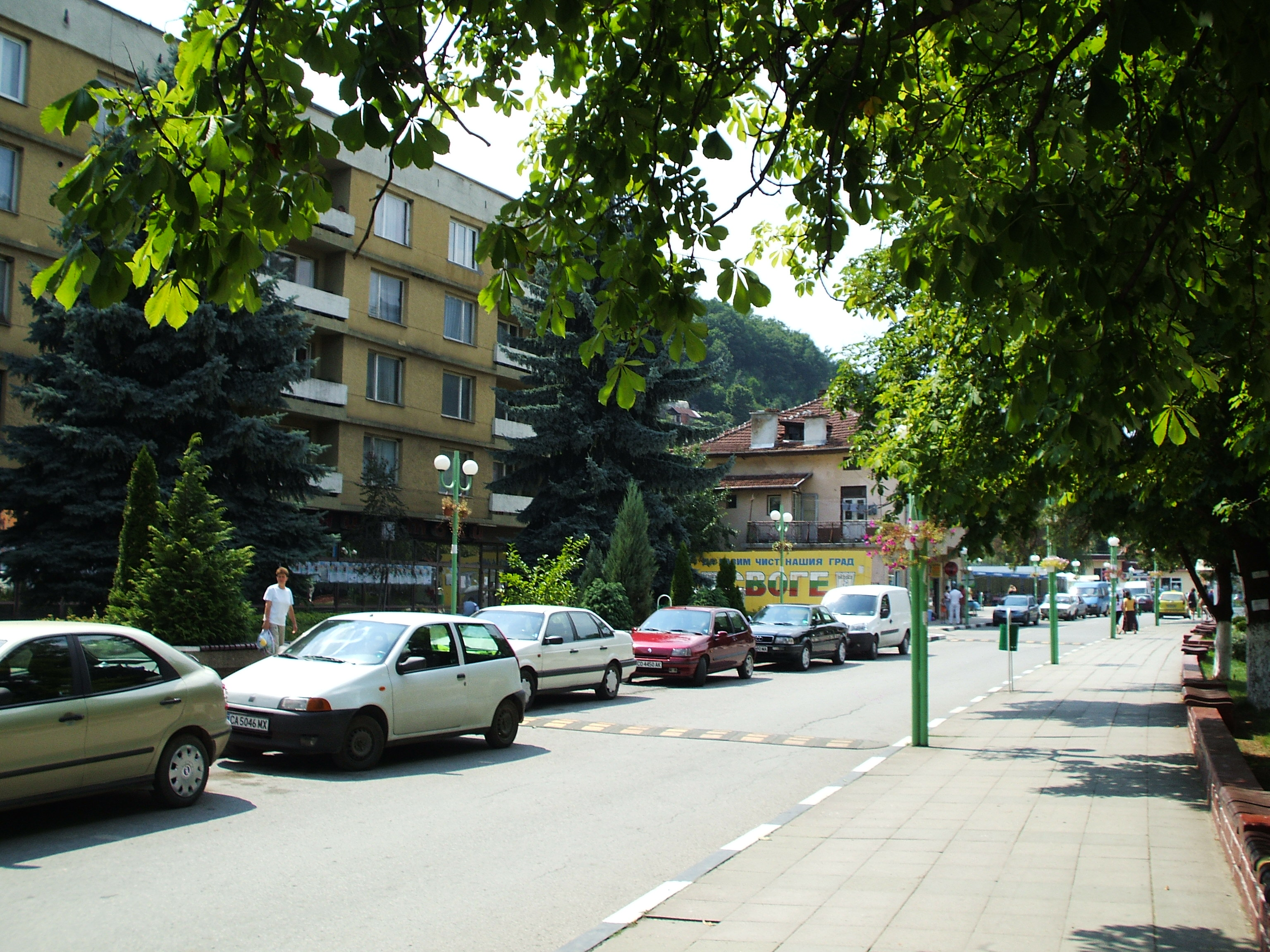
Svoge Central Street - Tsar Kaloyan

Svoge Knoll on Livingston Island in the South Shetland Islands, Antarctica is named after Svoge.
