= Bowles West Peak =

Mountain in Livingston Island, South Shetland Islands, Antarctica

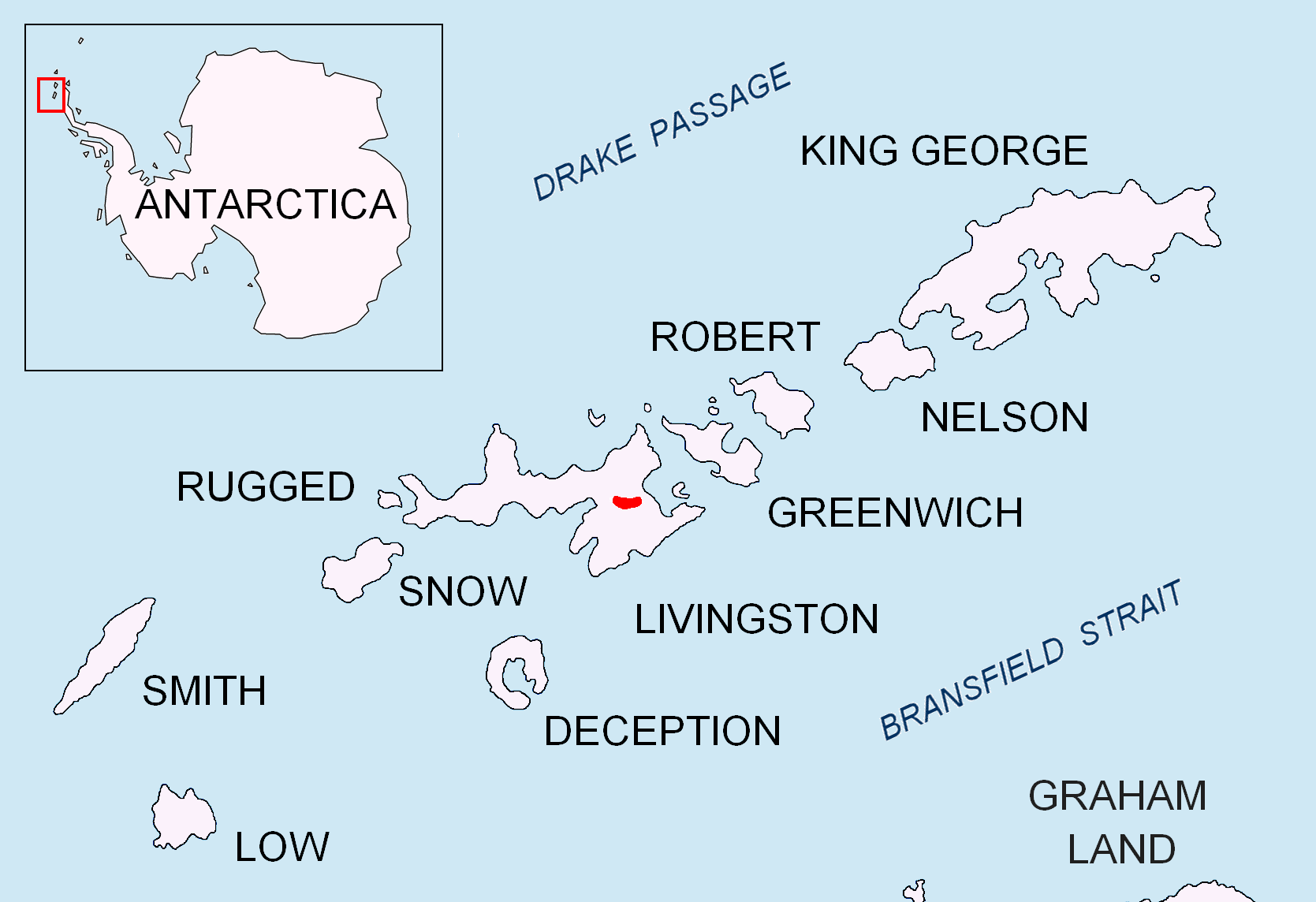
Location of Bowles Ridge on Livingston Island in the South Shetland Islands.

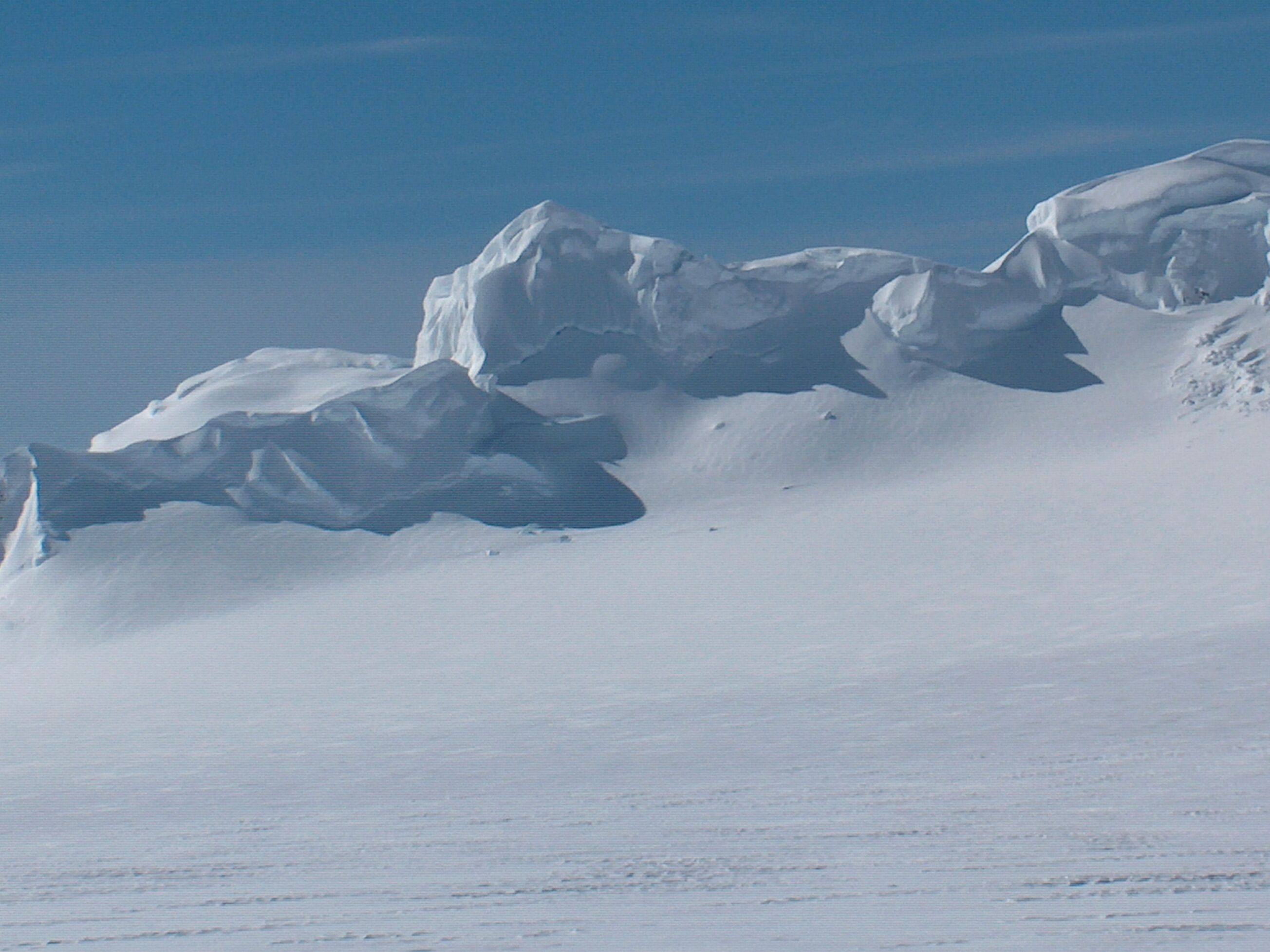
Bowles West Peak from Orpheus Gate.

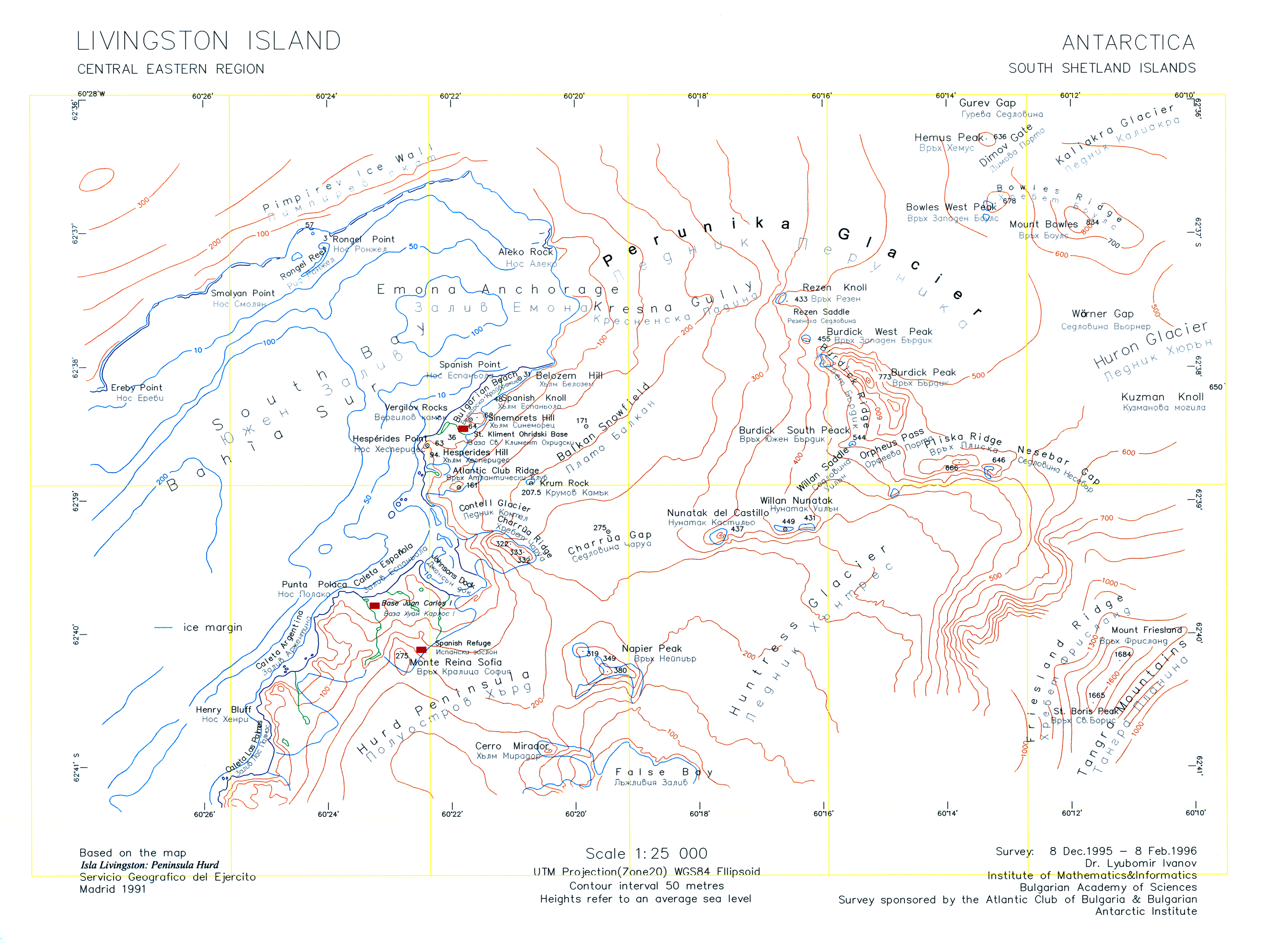
Topographic map of central-eastern Livingston Island featuring Bowles West Peak.

Topographic map of Livingston Island, Greenwich, Robert, Snow and Smith Islands.

Bowles West Peak (Bulgarian: връх западен Боулс, romanized: vrah zapaden Bouls, IPA: [ˈvrɤɣ ˈzapɐdɛn ˈbɔuɫs]) is a peak rising to 678 m at the western extremity of Bowles Ridge in eastern Livingston Island in Antarctica. The peak has precipitous and partly ice-free western slopes and overlooks Perunika Glacier to the southwest.

The feature takes its name from Mount Bowles, the summit of the eponymous ridge.

== Location ==
The peak is located at 62°36′47.5″S 60°13′13″W which is 1 km west by north of Mount Bowles (822 m), 790 m south by east of Hemus Peak, 6.24 km east of Aleko Rock and 3.2 km east by northeast of Rezen Knoll.

The peak was roughly mapped by the British in 1968 and the Spanish in 1991. The peak was mapped by Bulgaria from a 1995-96 topographic survey.

== Maps ==
- L.L. Ivanov et al. Antarctica: Livingston Island and Greenwich Island, South Shetland Islands. Scale 1:100000 topographic map. Sofia: Antarctic Place-names Commission of Bulgaria, 2005.
- L.L. Ivanov. Antarctica: Livingston Island and Greenwich, Robert, Snow and Smith Islands. Scale 1:120000 topographic map. Troyan: Manfred Wörner Foundation, 2009.
- A. Kamburov and L. Ivanov. Bowles Ridge and Central Tangra Mountains: Livingston Island, Antarctica. Scale 1:25000 map. Sofia: Manfred Wörner Foundation, 2023. ISBN 978-619-90008-6-1
