= Hemus Peak =

Mountain on Livingston Island, Antarctica

Location of Livingston Island in the South Shetland Islands

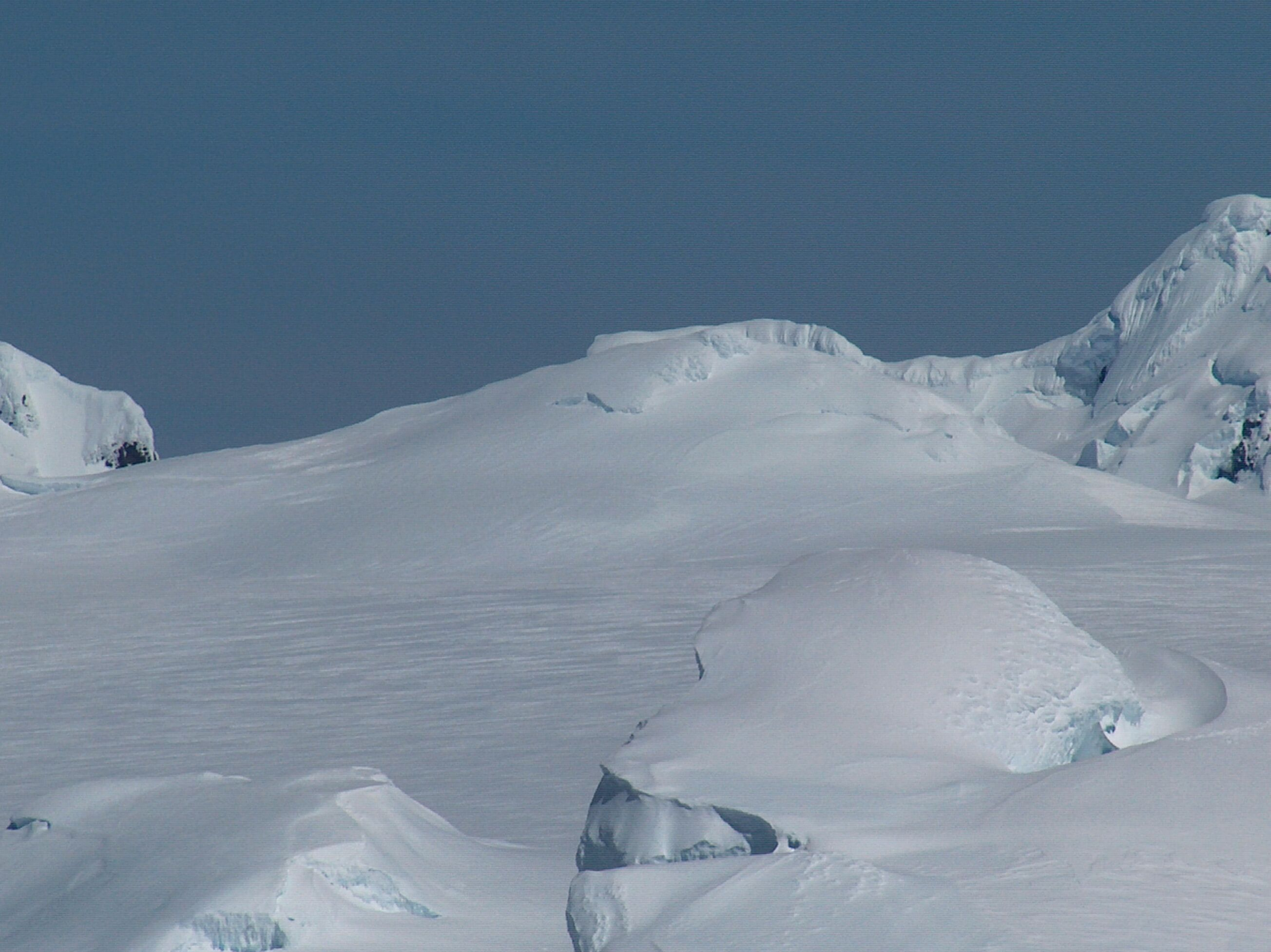
Hemus Peak (in the background) from Zemen Knoll

Topographic map of Livingston Island, Greenwich, Robert, Snow and Smith Islands

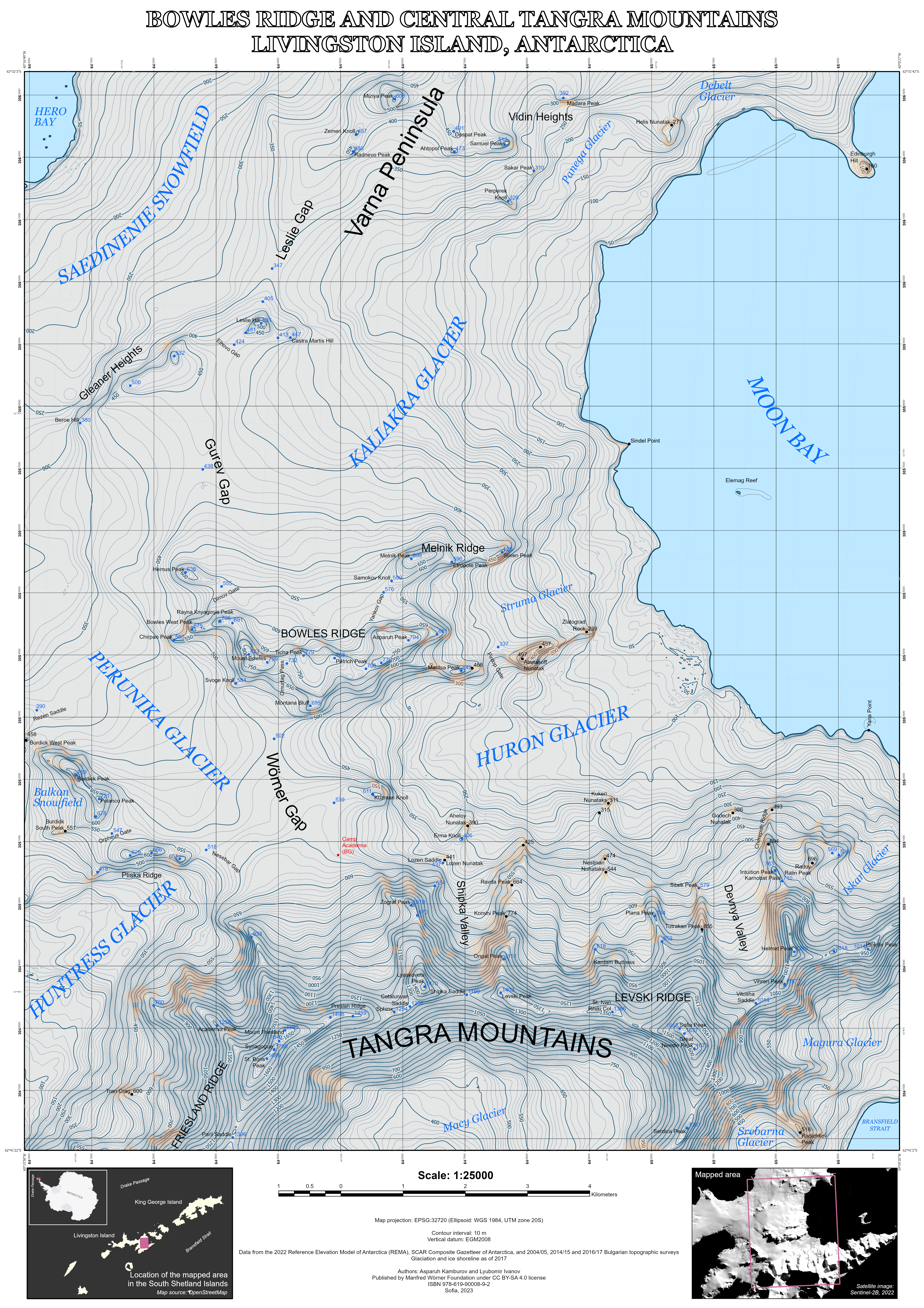
Topographic map of Bowles Ridge and central Tangra Mountains featuring Hemus Peak

Hemus Peak (Bulgarian: връх Хемус, romanized: vrah Hemus, IPA: [ˈvrɤx ˈxɛmos]) is an ice-covered peak rising to 636 metres (2,087 ft) off the northwest extremity of Bowles Ridge in eastern Livingston Island. The feature is 850 metres (2,790 ft) long in east-west direction and 550 metres (1,800 ft) wide, and overlooks Kaliakra Glacier to the northeast and Perunika Glacier to the southwest. Hemus is an ancient name of Stara Planina (Balkan Mountains), the central mountain range separating northern from southern Bulgaria.

== Location ==
The peak is located at 62°36′22″S 60°13′14″W, which is 1.51 kilometres (0.94 mi) northwest of Mount Bowles (822 metres (2,697 ft), summit of Bowles Ridge), 800 metres (2,600 ft) north-northwest of Rayna Knyaginya Peak, 1.01 kilometres (0.63 mi) north-northeast of Chirpan Peak, 3.6 kilometres (2.2 mi) northeast of Rezen Knoll, 6.27 kilometres (3.90 mi) m east by north of Aleko Point, and 3.6 kilometres (2.2 mi) south by east of the summit of Gleaner Heights (1,809 metres (5,935 ft)) (Rough British mapping in 1968, Bulgarian mapping from a 1995-96 ground survey).

== Maps ==
- South Shetland Islands. Scale 1:200000 topographic map. DOS 610 Sheet W 62 60. Tolworth, UK, 1968.
- Islas Livingston y Decepción. Mapa topográfico a escala 1:100000. Madrid: Servicio Geográfico del Ejército, 1991.
- L.L. Ivanov. Livingston Island: Central-Eastern Region. Scale 1:25000 topographic map. Sofia: Antarctic Place-names Commission of Bulgaria, 1996.
- S. Soccol, D. Gildea and J. Bath. Livingston Island, Antarctica. Scale 1:100000 satellite map. The Omega Foundation, USA, 2004.
- L.L. Ivanov et al., Antarctica: Livingston Island and Greenwich Island, South Shetland Islands (from English Strait to Morton Strait, with illustrations and ice-cover distribution), 1:100000 scale topographic map, Antarctic Place-names Commission of Bulgaria, Sofia, 2005
- L.L. Ivanov. Antarctica: Livingston Island and Greenwich, Robert, Snow and Smith Islands. Scale 1:120000 topographic map. Troyan: Manfred Wörner Foundation, 2010. ISBN 978-954-92032-9-5 (First edition 2009. ISBN 978-954-92032-6-4)
- Antarctic Digital Database (ADD). Scale 1:250000 topographic map of Antarctica. Scientific Committee on Antarctic Research (SCAR), 1993–2016.
- A. Kamburov and L. Ivanov. Bowles Ridge and Central Tangra Mountains: Livingston Island, Antarctica. Scale 1:25000 map. Sofia: Manfred Wörner Foundation, 2023. ISBN 978-619-90008-6-1
