= Raquelia Rocks =

Rocks in the South Shetland Islands, Antarctica

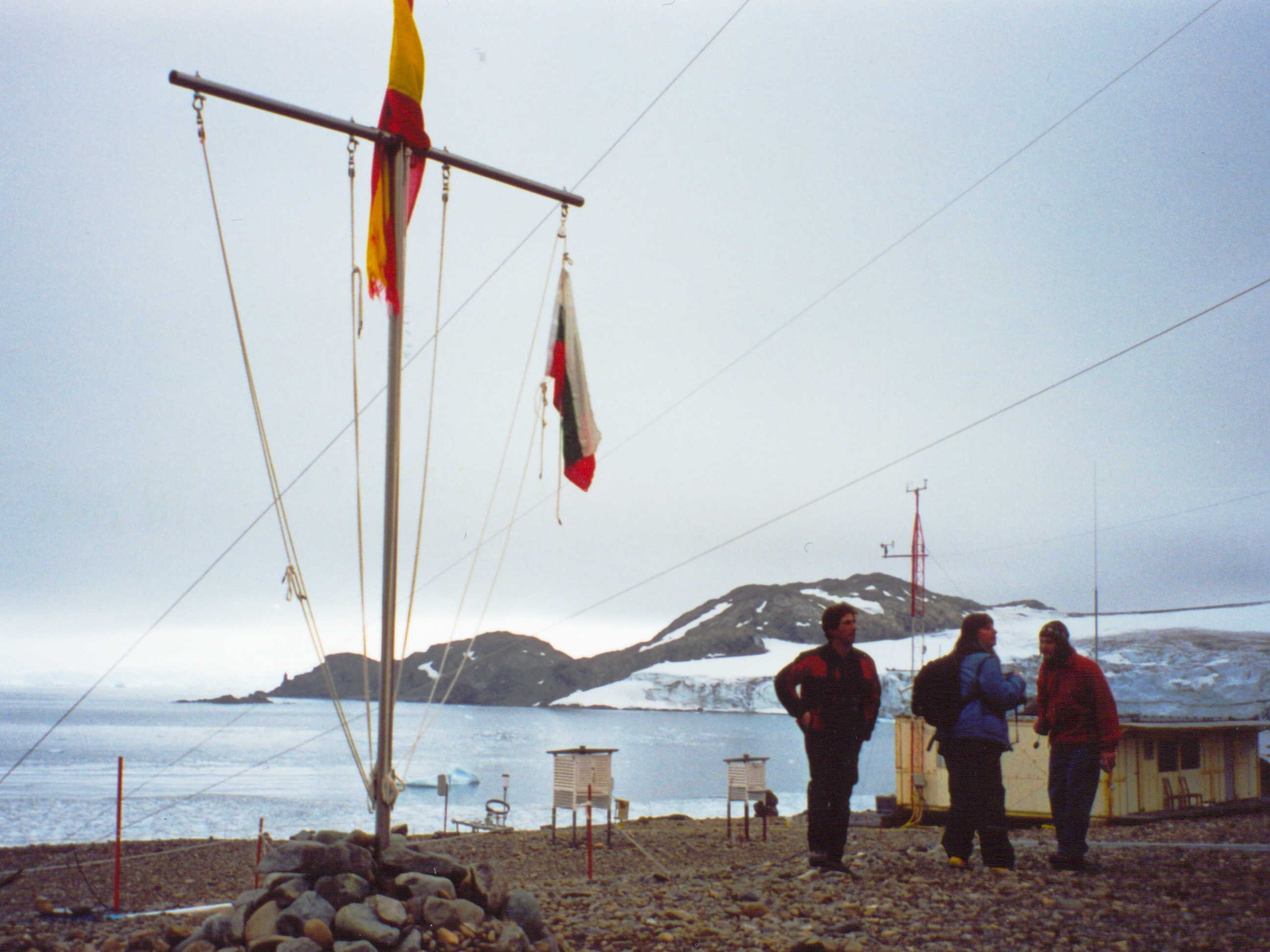
- Raquelia Rocks, Hespérides Point, Hesperides Hill, Atlantic Club Ridge and Contell Glacier (left to right) from Juan Carlos Primero Base

- Location of Livingston Island in the South Shetland Islands

- Location on Antarctic Peninsula Location in Antarctica

Geography
- Location: Antarctica
- Coordinates: 62°39′02.5″S 60°22′49″W
- Archipelago: South Shetland Islands

Administration
- Antarctica
- Administered under the Antarctic Treaty System

Demographics
- Population: uninhabited

Raquelia Rocks is a group of three adjacent rocks in eastern South Bay, Livingston Island in the South Shetland Islands, Antarctica formed by an offshoot of Atlantic Club Ridge halfway along the Zodiac boat route linking the Spanish Antarctic Base and the Bulgarian Antarctic Base on the island. The area was visited by early 19th century sealers operating from nearby Johnsons Dock.

The feature's name appeared first on a 1998 Spanish chart.

== Location ==
The rocks are located at 62°39′02.5″S 60°22′49″W which is 820 m (897 yd) south-southwest of Hespérides Point, 350 m (383 yd) from the nearest coastal point and 830 m (908 yd) west-northwest of Ballester Point (British mapping in 1968, Chilean in 1971, Argentine in 1980, detailed Spanish mapping in 1991, and Bulgarian mapping in 1996, 2005 and 2009).

Topographic map of Livingston Island, Greenwich, Robert, Snow and Smith Islands

== See also ==
- Composite Antarctic Gazetteer
- List of Antarctic islands south of 60° S
- SCAR
- Territorial claims in Antarctica

== Maps ==
- Isla Livingston: Península Hurd. Mapa topográfico de escala 1:25 000. Madrid: Servicio Geográfico del Ejército, 1991.
- L.L. Ivanov. Livingston Island: Central-Eastern Region. Scale 1:25000 topographic map. Sofia: Antarctic Place-names Commission of Bulgaria, 1996.
- L.L. Ivanov et al. Antarctica: Livingston Island and Greenwich Island, South Shetland Islands. Scale 1:100000 topographic map. Sofia: Antarctic Place-names Commission of Bulgaria, 2005.
- L.L. Ivanov. Antarctica: Livingston Island and Greenwich, Robert, Snow and Smith Islands. Scale 1:120000 topographic map. Troyan: Manfred Wörner Foundation, 2009. ISBN 978-954-92032-6-4
