= Las Palmas Cove =

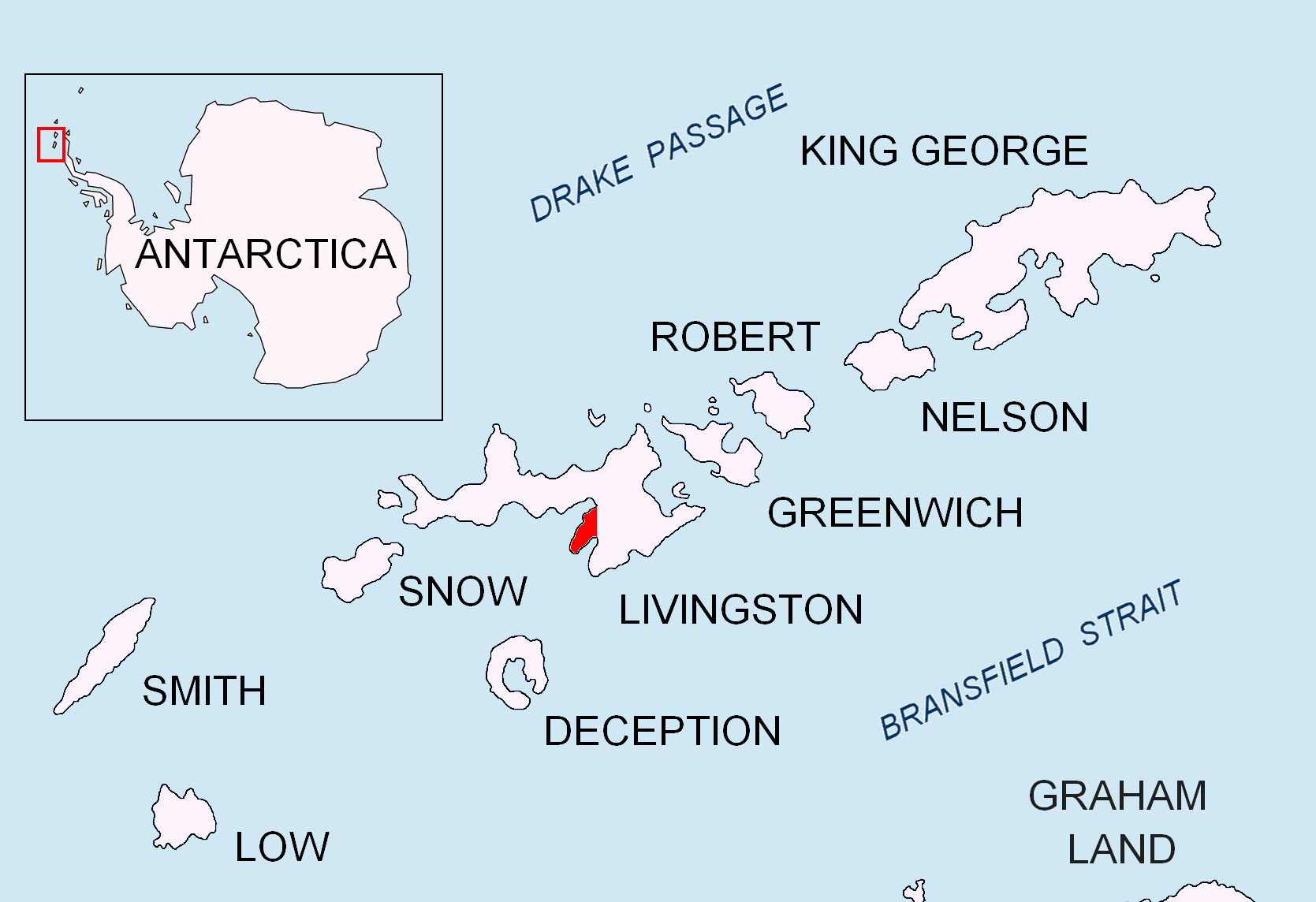
Location of Hurd Peninsula in the South Shetland Islands.

Topographic map of Livingston Island and Smith Island.

Las Palmas Cove is a 1.97 km (1.22 mi) wide embayment indenting for 500 m (1,600 ft) the northwest coast of Hurd Peninsula on Livingston Island in the South Shetland Islands, Antarctica. It is part of South Bay, Livingston Island entered between Henry Bluff and Salisbury Bluff. The area was visited by early 19th century sealers operating from nearby Johnsons Dock. It also where the Las Palmas Glacier terminates.

The feature was mapped and named in 1991 by the Spanish Antarctic Expedition after the Antarctic supply ship Las Palmas, Spanish Navy.

== Location ==
The cove's midpoint is located at 62°40′57.2″S 60°25′02.1″W which is 4.84 km south-southwest of Hespérides Point and 4.32 km (2.68 mi) north by east of Miers Bluff (British mapping in and 1968, detailed Spanish mapping in 1991, and Bulgarian mapping in 2005 and 2009).

== Maps ==
- Isla Livingston: Península Hurd. Mapa topográfico de escala 1:25000. Madrid: Servicio Geográfico del Ejército, 1991. (Map reproduced on p. 16 of the linked work)
- L.L. Ivanov et al. Antarctica: Livingston Island and Greenwich Island, South Shetland Islands. Scale 1:100000 topographic map. Sofia: Antarctic Place-names Commission of Bulgaria, 2005.
- L.L. Ivanov. Antarctica: Livingston Island and Greenwich, Robert, Snow and Smith Islands. Scale 1:120000 topographic map. Troyan: Manfred Wörner Foundation, 2009. ISBN 978-954-92032-6-4
- Antarctic Digital Database (ADD). Scale 1:250000 topographic map of Antarctica. Scientific Committee on Antarctic Research (SCAR). Since 1993, regularly upgraded and updated.
- L.L. Ivanov. Antarctica: Livingston Island and Smith Island. Scale 1:100000 topographic map. Manfred Wörner Foundation, 2017. ISBN 978-619-90008-3-0
