= Argentina Glacier =

Glacier in Antarctica

- Location within South Shetland Islands Location within Antarctica
- Location: Livingston Island
- Coordinates: 62°41′S 60°24′W
- Terminus: Argentina Cove

Topographic map of Livingston Island and Smith Island

Argentina Glacier is a glacier flowing northwest from Hurd Dome and terminating near Argentina Cove, South Bay, on Livingston Island, in the South Shetland Islands. The name Argentina Glacier was given in association with Argentina Cove by the Spanish Antarctic Expedition, about 1995.

== See also ==
- List of glaciers in the Antarctic
- Glaciology

== Maps ==
- Península Byers, Isla Livingston. Mapa topográfico a escala 1:25000. Madrid: Servicio Geográfico del Ejército, 1992.
- L.L. Ivanov et al. Antarctica: Livingston Island and Greenwich Island, South Shetland Islands. Scale 1:100000 topographic map. Sofia: Antarctic Place-names Commission of Bulgaria, 2005.
- L.L. Ivanov. Antarctica: Livingston Island and Greenwich, Robert, Snow and Smith Islands. Scale 1:120000 topographic map. Troyan: Manfred Wörner Foundation, 2009. ISBN 978-954-92032-6-4
