= Argentina Cove =

Embayment indenting the southeast coast of Hurd Peninsula, Livingston Island

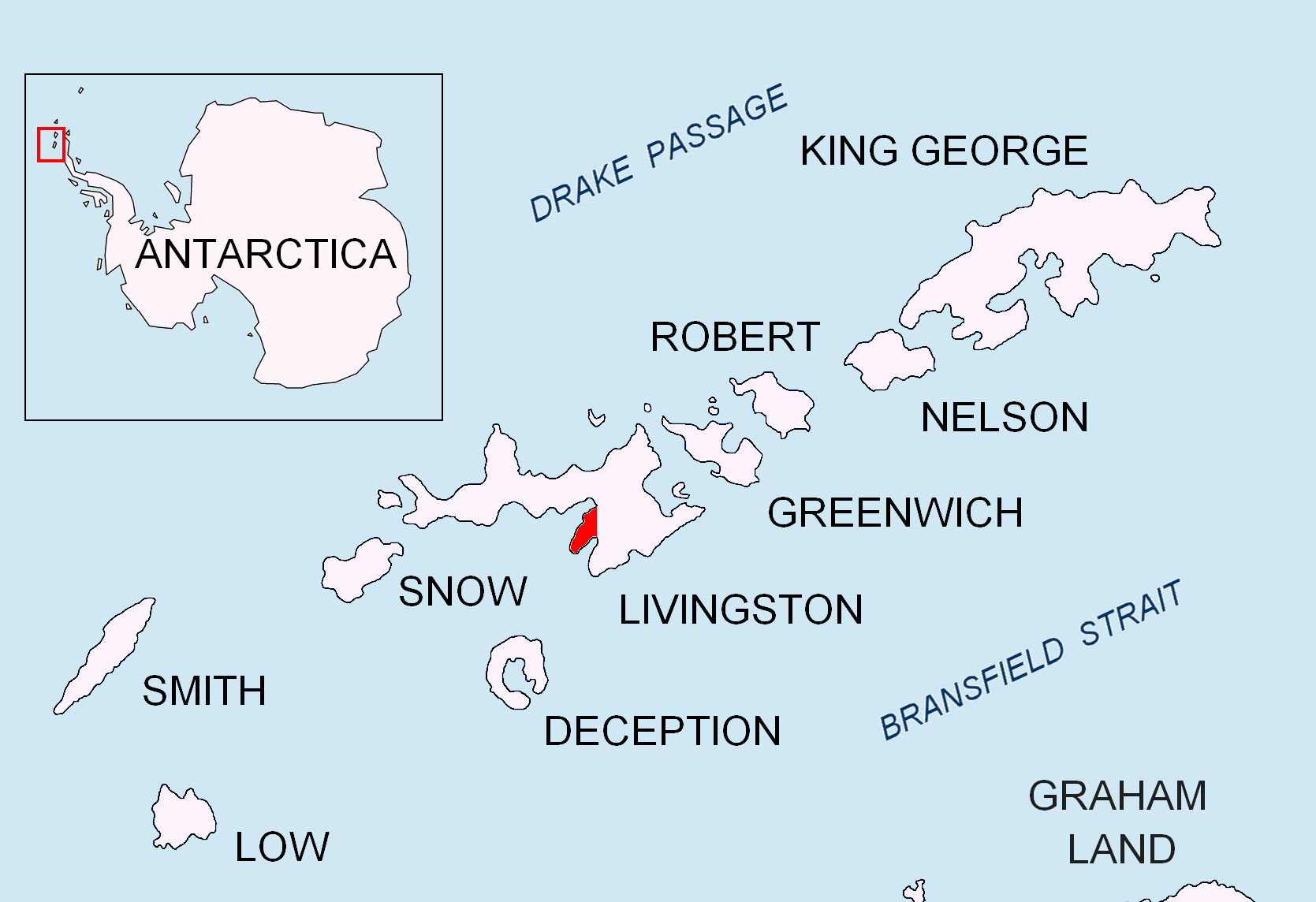
Location of Hurd Peninsula in the South Shetland Islands.

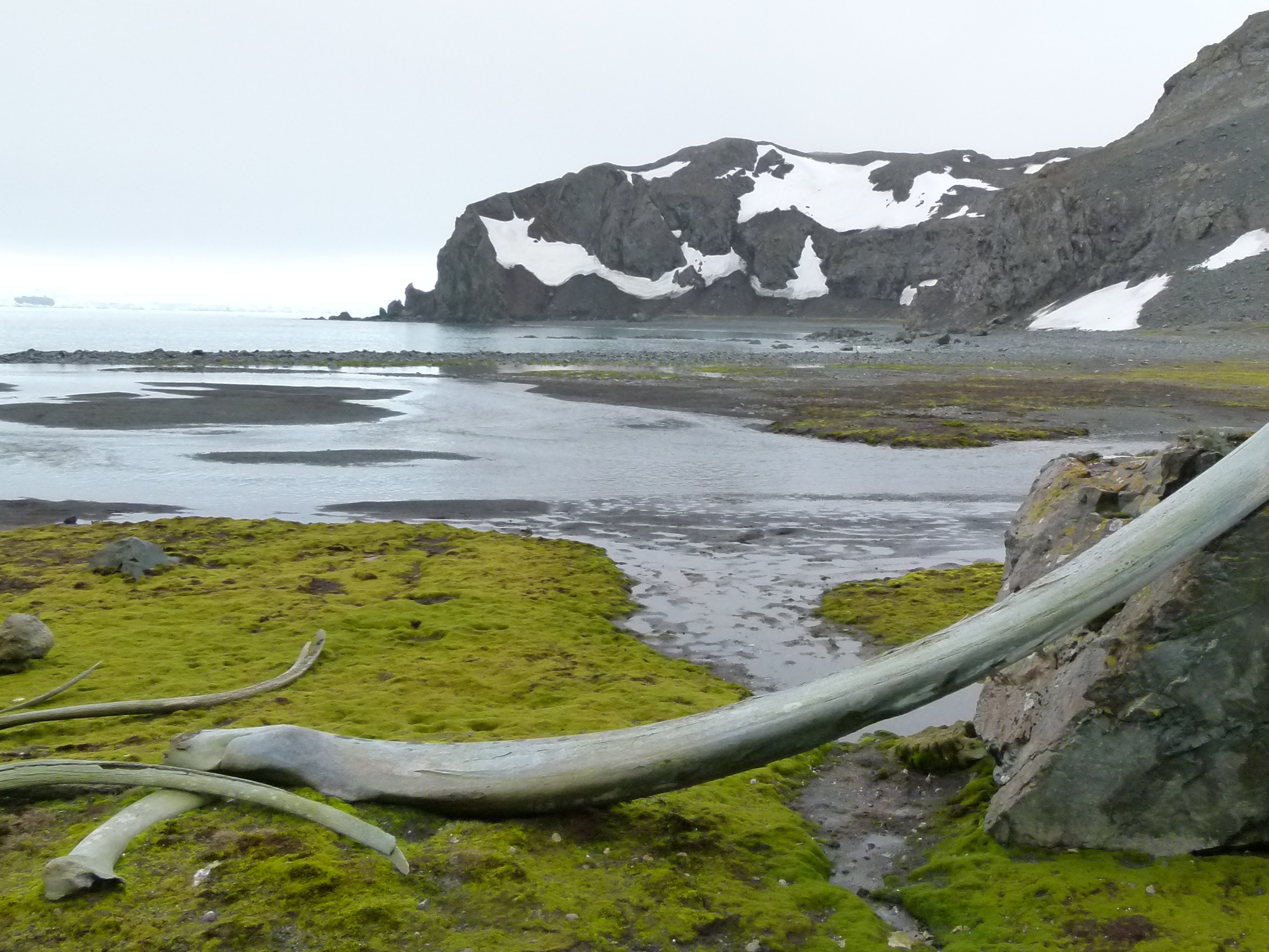
On the cove's beach.

Topographic map of Livingston Island and Smith Island.

Argentina Cove is a 1.28 km wide embayment indenting for 330 m the southeast coast of Hurd Peninsula, Livingston Island in the South Shetland Islands, Antarctica. It is part of South Bay, entered between Polish Bluff and Henry Bluff. The area was frequented by early 19th century sealers operating from nearby Johnsons Dock.

The feature was mapped and named by the Spanish Antarctic Expedition in 1991.

== Location ==
The cove's midpoint is located at 62°40′11.1″S 60°24′20.8″W which is 3.3 km south-southwest of Hespérides Point and 5.84 km north-northeast of Miers Bluff (British mapping in and 1968, detailed Spanish mapping in 1991, and Bulgarian mapping in 1996, 2005 and 2009).

== Maps ==
- Isla Livingston: Península Hurd. Mapa topográfico de escala 1:25000. Madrid: Servicio Geográfico del Ejército, 1991. (Map reproduced on p. 16 of the linked work)
- L.L. Ivanov. Livingston Island: Central-Eastern Region. Scale 1:25000 topographic map. Sofia: Antarctic Place-names Commission of Bulgaria, 1996.
- L.L. Ivanov et al. Antarctica: Livingston Island and Greenwich Island, South Shetland Islands. Scale 1:100000 topographic map. Sofia: Antarctic Place-names Commission of Bulgaria, 2005.
- L.L. Ivanov. Antarctica: Livingston Island and Greenwich, Robert, Snow and Smith Islands. Scale 1:120000 topographic map. Troyan: Manfred Wörner Foundation, 2009. ISBN 978-954-92032-6-4
- Antarctic Digital Database (ADD). Scale 1:250000 topographic map of Antarctica. Scientific Committee on Antarctic Research (SCAR). Since 1993, regularly upgraded and updated.
- L.L. Ivanov. Antarctica: Livingston Island and Smith Island. Scale 1:100000 topographic map. Manfred Wörner Foundation, 2017. ISBN 978-619-90008-3-0
