= Polish Bluff =

Geographic point in Hurd Peninsula, Livingston Island

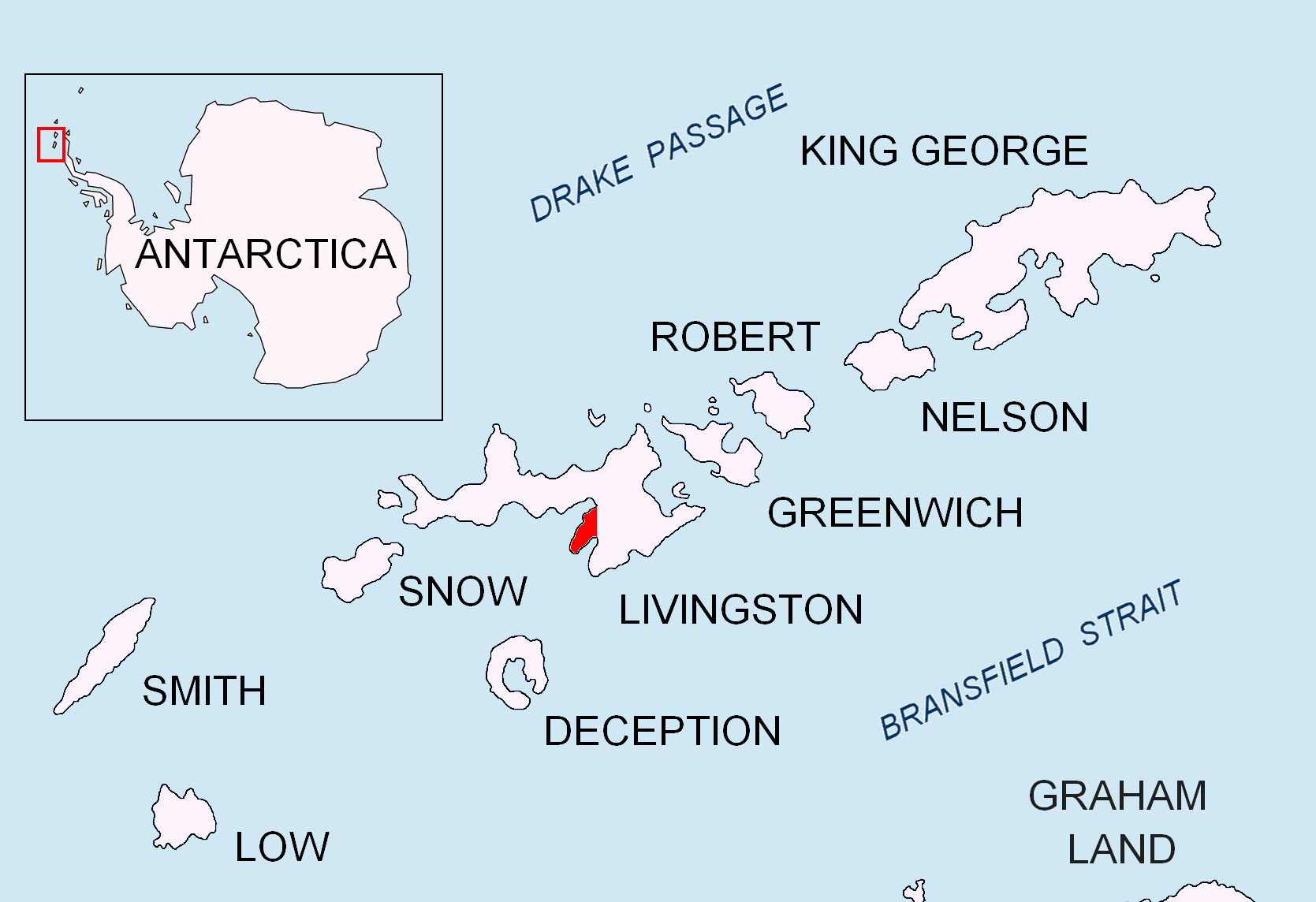
Location of Hurd Peninsula in the South Shetland Islands.

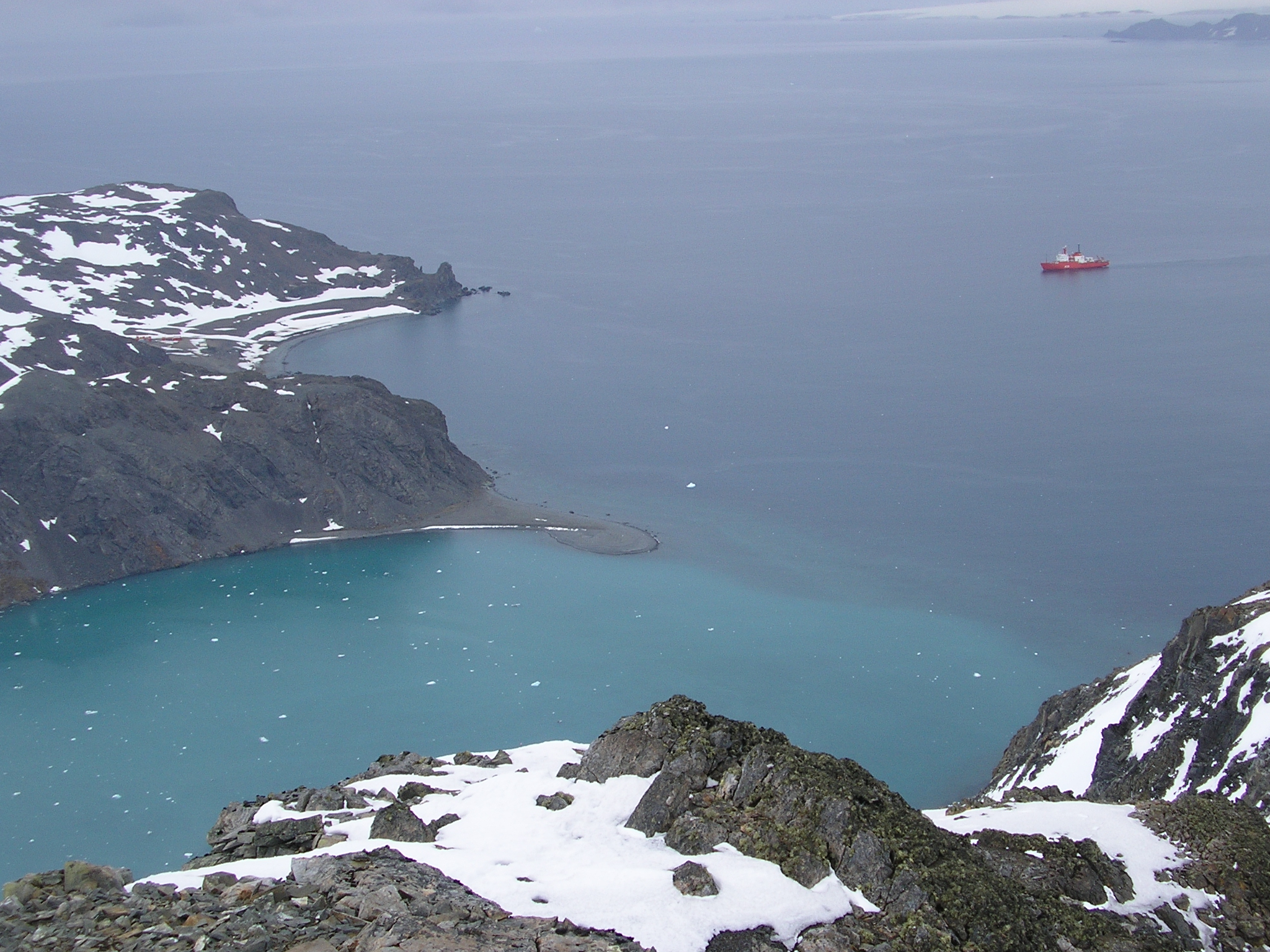
Polish Bluff (in the background) from Charrúa Ridge.

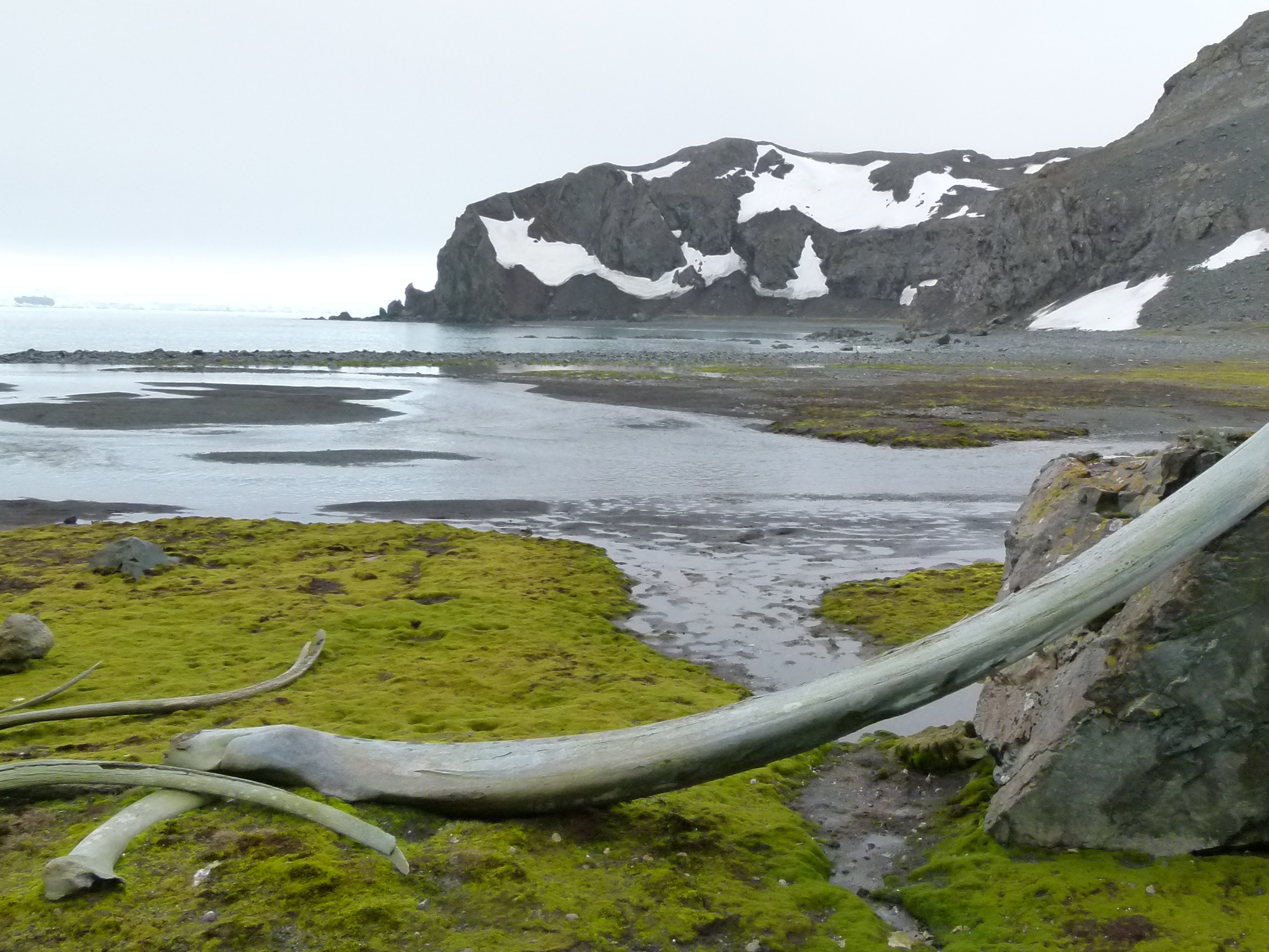
Polish Bluff from Argentina Cove beach.

Topographic map of Livingston Island and Smith Island.

Polish Bluff (Spanish: Punta Polaca) is a point forming the southwest side of the entrance to Española Cove and the northeast side of the entrance to Argentina Cove in Hurd Peninsula, Livingston Island in the South Shetland Islands, Antarctica. The area was visited by early 19th century sealers operating from nearby Johnsons Dock.

The feature was charted and named by the Spanish Antarctic Expedition in 1988 in appreciation of the Polish logistic support in the building of Juan Carlos I Antarctic Base.

== Location ==
The point is located at 62°39′56.2″S 60°24′04.4″W which is 1.59 km southwest of Ballester Point, 1.27 km northeast of Henry Bluff and 4. 47 km southwest of Ereby Point (British mapping in 1968, detailed Spanish mapping in 1991, Bulgarian mapping in 1996, 2005 and 2009).

== Maps ==
- Isla Livingston: Península Hurd. Mapa topográfico de escala 1:25000. Madrid: Servicio Geográfico del Ejército, 1991. (Map reproduced on p. 16 of the linked work)
- L.L. Ivanov. Livingston Island: Central-Eastern Region. Scale 1:25000 topographic map. Sofia: Antarctic Place-names Commission of Bulgaria, 1996.
- L.L. Ivanov et al., Antarctica: Livingston Island and Greenwich Island, South Shetland Islands (from English Strait to Morton Strait, with illustrations and ice-cover distribution), Scale 1: 100000 map, Antarctic Place-names Commission of Bulgaria, Ministry of Foreign Affairs, Sofia, 2005.
- L.L. Ivanov. Antarctica: Livingston Island and Greenwich, Robert, Snow and Smith Islands. Scale 1:120000 topographic map. Troyan: Manfred Wörner Foundation, 2009.
- Antarctic Digital Database (ADD). Scale 1:250000 topographic map of Antarctica. Scientific Committee on Antarctic Research (SCAR). Since 1993, regularly upgraded and updated.
- L.L. Ivanov. Antarctica: Livingston Island and Smith Island. Scale 1:100000 topographic map. Manfred Wörner Foundation, 2017. ISBN 978-619-90008-3-0
