= Salisbury Bluff =

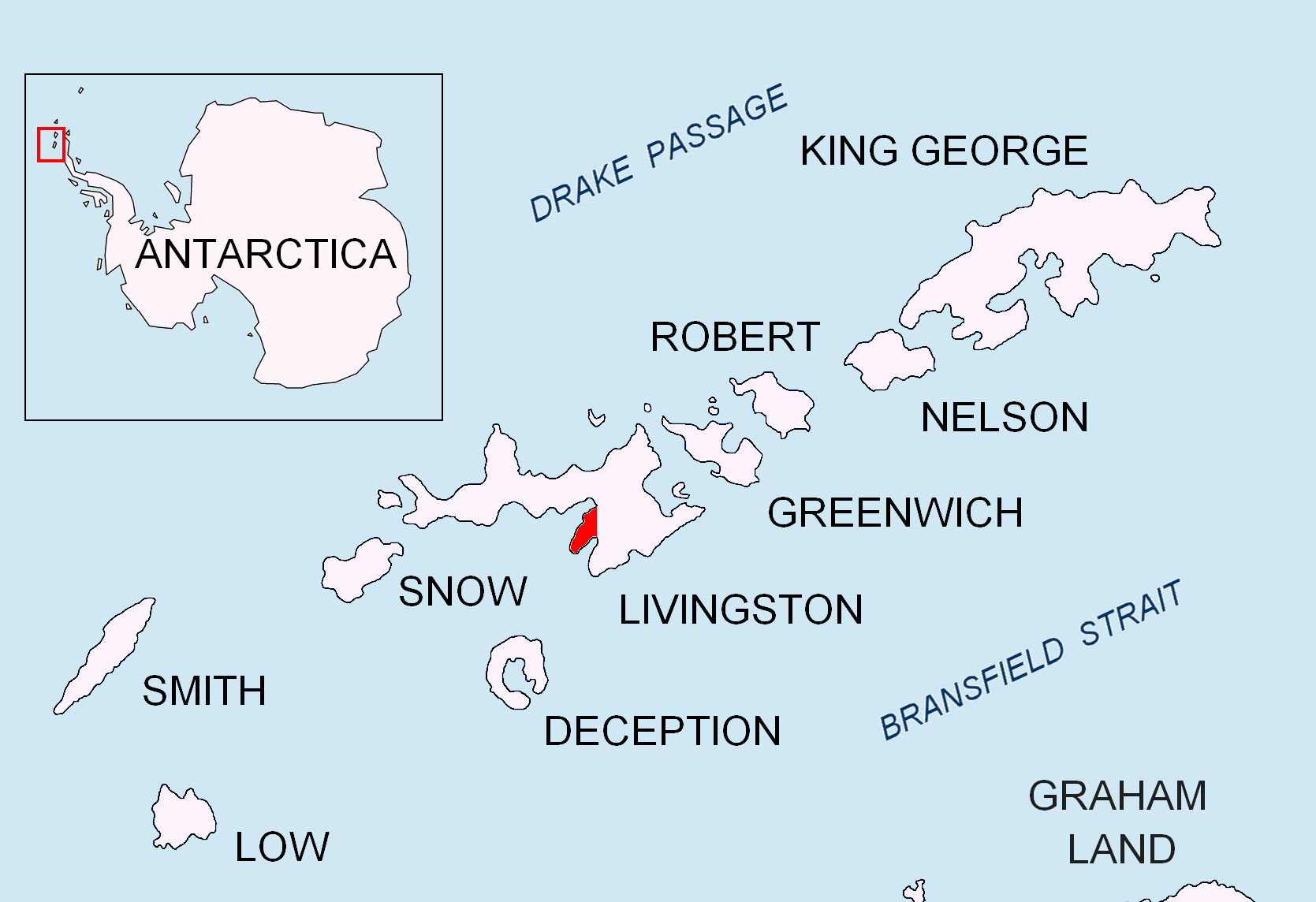
Location of Hurd Peninsula in the South Shetland Islands.

Topographic map of Livingston Island and Smith Island.

Salisbury Bluff is the point forming the south side of the entrance to Las Palmas Cove in Hurd Peninsula, Livingston Island in the South Shetland Islands, Antarctica and surmounted by a 161 m height. The area was visited by early 19th century sealers operating from nearby Johnsons Dock.

The feature is named after the British sealing vessel Salisbury under Captain Thomas Hodges, which visited the South Shetlands in 1820–21.

== Location ==
The point is located at 62°41′10.9″S 60°25′35.6″W which is 1.39 km south-southwest of Henry Bluff, 3.82 km north by east of Miers Bluff and 10.19 km east-southeast of Hannah Point (British mapping in 1968, detailed Spanish mapping in 1991, Bulgarian mapping in 2005 and 2009).

== Maps ==
- Isla Livingston: Península Hurd. Mapa topográfico de escala 1:25000. Madrid: Servicio Geográfico del Ejército, 1991. (Map reproduced on p. 16 of the linked work)
- L.L. Ivanov et al., Antarctica: Livingston Island and Greenwich Island, South Shetland Islands (from English Strait to Morton Strait, with illustrations and ice-cover distribution), Scale 1: 100000 map, Antarctic Place-names Commission of Bulgaria, Ministry of Foreign Affairs, Sofia, 2005.
- L.L. Ivanov. Antarctica: Livingston Island and Greenwich, Robert, Snow and Smith Islands. Scale 1:120000 topographic map. Troyan: Manfred Wörner Foundation, 2009.
- Antarctic Digital Database (ADD). Scale 1:250000 topographic map of Antarctica. Scientific Committee on Antarctic Research (SCAR). Since 1993, regularly upgraded and updated.
- L.L. Ivanov. Antarctica: Livingston Island and Smith Island. Scale 1:100000 topographic map. Manfred Wörner Foundation, 2017. ISBN 978-619-90008-3-0
