= Las Palmas Glacier =

Glacier in Antarctica

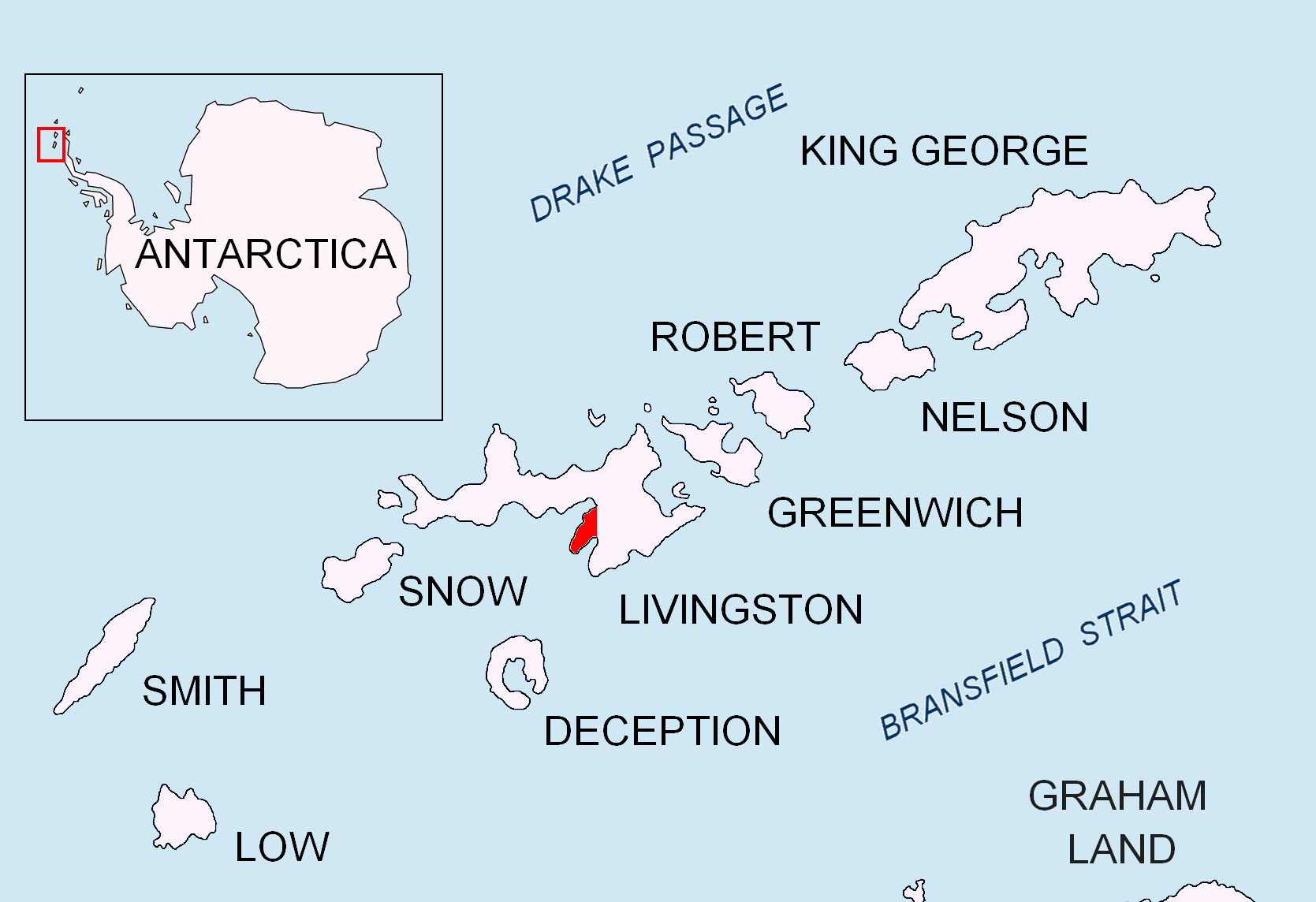
- Location of Hurd Peninsula on Livingston Island in the South Shetland Islands

- Location within South Shetland Islands Location within Antarctica
- Location: Livingston Island; South Shetland Islands
- Coordinates: 62°41′00″S 60°25′00″W
- Thickness: unknown
- Terminus: Las Palmas Cove
- Status: unknown

Topographic map of Livingston Island and Smith Island.

Las Palmas Glacier (62°41′S 60°25′W) is a glacier flowing west-northwest from Hurd Dome and terminating at Las Palmas Cove, South Bay, Livingston Island, Antarctica. The name was given by the Spanish Antarctic Expedition, about 1991, after the ship Las Palmas of the Spanish Antarctic campaigns since 1988.

== See also ==
- List of glaciers in the Antarctic
- Glaciology

== Maps ==
- Isla Livingston: Península Hurd. Mapa topográfico de escala 1:25000. Madrid: Servicio Geográfico del Ejército, 1991. (Map reproduced on p. 16 of the linked work)
- L.L. Ivanov et al. Antarctica: Livingston Island and Greenwich Island, South Shetland Islands. Scale 1:100000 topographic map. Sofia: Antarctic Place-names Commission of Bulgaria, 2005.
- L.L. Ivanov. Antarctica: Livingston Island and Greenwich, Robert, Snow and Smith Islands. Scale 1:120000 topographic map. Troyan: Manfred Wörner Foundation, 2009. ISBN 978-954-92032-6-4
- Antarctic Digital Database (ADD). Scale 1:250000 topographic map of Antarctica. Scientific Committee on Antarctic Research (SCAR). Since 1993, regularly upgraded and updated.
- L.L. Ivanov. Antarctica: Livingston Island and Smith Island. Scale 1:100000 topographic map. Manfred Wörner Foundation, 2017. ISBN 978-619-90008-3-0
