= Henry Bluff =

Geographical marker in Antarctica

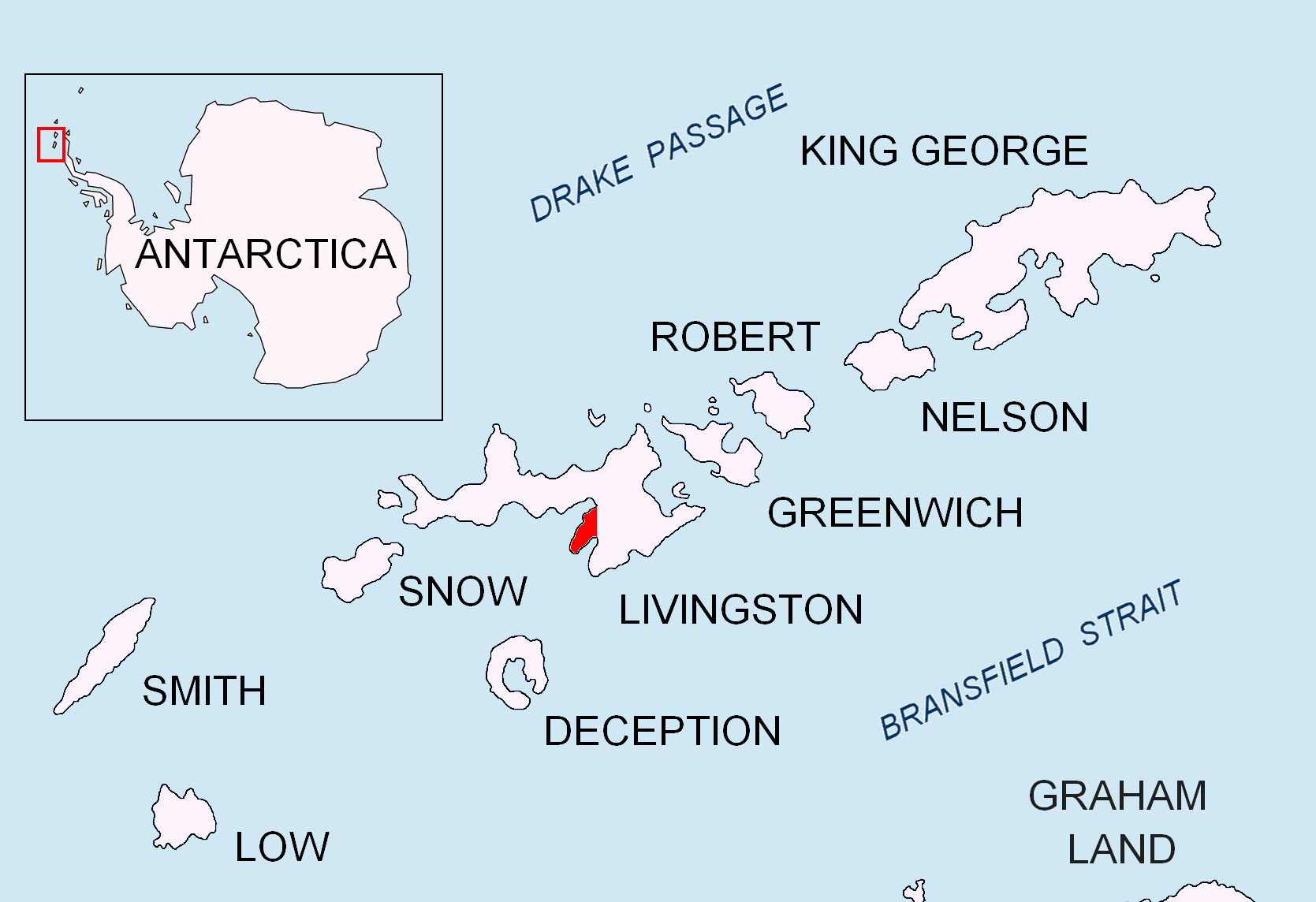
Location of Hurd Peninsula in the South Shetland Islands.

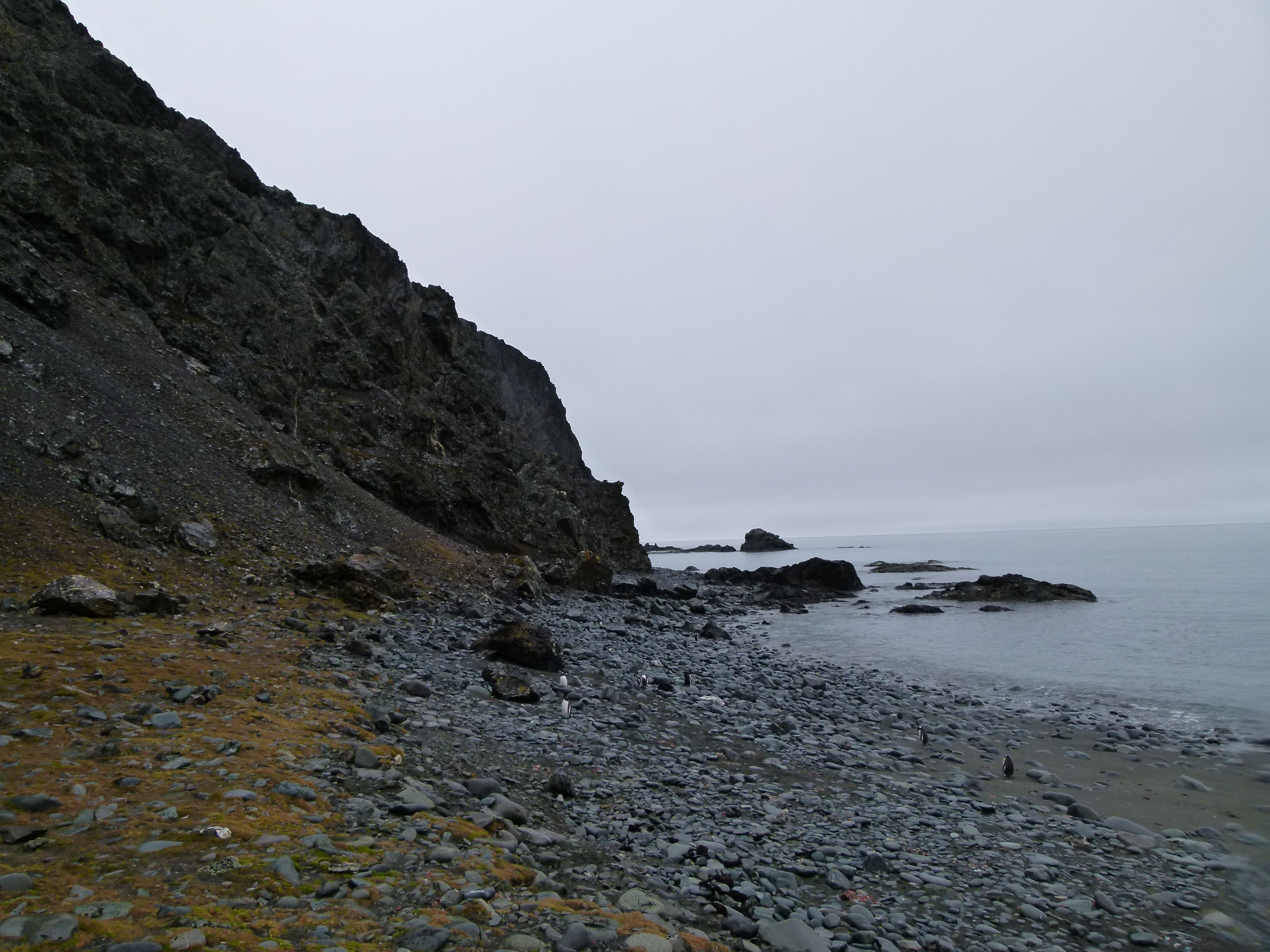
Henry Bluff from Argentina Cove beach.

Topographic map of Livingston Island and Smith Island.

Henry Bluff is a point forming the southwest side of the entrance to Argentina Cove and the north side of the entrance to Las Palmas Cove in Hurd Peninsula, Livingston Island in the South Shetland Islands, Antarctica. The point is dominated by a prominent monolithic formation rising to 163 m and named El Peñón ('The Rock') by personnel of the nearby Spanish Antarctic Base. The area was visited by early 19th century sealers operating from nearby Johnsons Dock.

The feature is named after the American sealing schooner Henry under Captain Benjamin Brunow who visited the South Shetlands in 1820–21.

== Location ==
The point is located at 62°40′30.6″S 60°24′52.1″W which is 1.27 km southwest of Polish Bluff, 1.39 km north-northeast of Salisbury Bluff and 4.96 km south-southeast of Ereby Point (British mapping in 1968, detailed Spanish mapping in 1991, Bulgarian mapping in 1996, 2005 and 2009).

== Maps ==
- Isla Livingston: Península Hurd. Mapa topográfico de escala 1:25000. Madrid: Servicio Geográfico del Ejército, 1991. (Map reproduced on p. 16 of the linked work)
- L.L. Ivanov. Livingston Island: Central-Eastern Region. Scale 1:25000 topographic map. Sofia: Antarctic Place-names Commission of Bulgaria, 1996.
- L.L. Ivanov et al., Antarctica: Livingston Island and Greenwich Island, South Shetland Islands (from English Strait to Morton Strait, with illustrations and ice-cover distribution), Scale 1: 100000 map, Antarctic Place-names Commission of Bulgaria, Ministry of Foreign Affairs, Sofia, 2005.
- L.L. Ivanov. Antarctica: Livingston Island and Greenwich, Robert, Snow and Smith Islands. Scale 1:120000 topographic map. Troyan: Manfred Wörner Foundation, 2009.
- Antarctic Digital Database (ADD). Scale 1:250000 topographic map of Antarctica. Scientific Committee on Antarctic Research (SCAR). Since 1993, regularly upgraded and updated.
- L.L. Ivanov. Antarctica: Livingston Island and Smith Island. Scale 1:100000 topographic map. Manfred Wörner Foundation, 2017. ISBN 978-619-90008-3-0
