= Salisbury (1818 ship) =

History

United Kingdom
- Name: Salisbury
- Acquired: c.1815
- Fate: Wrecked 1 June 1827

General characteristics
- Tons burthen: 117, or 118, or 120, or 130 (bm)
- Armament: 2 × 12-pounder carronades
- Notes: Teak-built

Salisbury was launched c.1814 in the Brazils almost certainly under another name and was possibly a prize. She was possibly captured by the British or sold to British owners in 1815. She made one voyage seal hunting in 1820 and transported settlers to South Africa in 1821. She was lost in 1827.

== Origins and career ==
Salisbury origins and career are difficult to untangle because there were at various times several vessels by that name, all ranging between 117 and 125 tons burthen, and having similar trades. In 1821 Lloyd's Register (LR) carried two vessels named Salisbury, and the Register of Shipping carried four. It appears that LR missed one vessel completely and may have conflated two different vessels.

Salisbury first appeared in LR in 1815 with S. Creedy, master, London owners, and trade London–Sierra Leone. Her origins were given as a foreign prize. She first appeared in the Register of Shipping (RS) with J. Creedy, master, Craig, owner, and trade London–Africa. Her origins were given as Portugal, built in 1812. However, in 1818 RS had two listings for Salisbury while LR had one that seemingly combined the two listings in RS.

Year	Master	Owner	Trade	Source
1818	Vanthusen	Craig	London–St Leonards	RS; Portugal origin
1818	L.Cadie	Smith & Co.	Liverpool–Trieste	RS; Foreign origin
1818	Haythusen; J.Eadie	London; Smith & Co.	London–Sierra Leone; Liverpool—Trieste	LR; Foreign prize
1819	Vanthusen	Craig	London–St Leonards	RS; Portugal origin
1819	J.Cadie	Smith & Co.	Liverpool–Trieste	RS; Foreign origin
1819	J.Eadie	Smith & Co.	Liverpool–Trieste	LR; Foreign prize
1820	Vanthusen	Craig	London–Sierra Leone	RS; Portugal origin
1820	J.Cadie	Smith & Co.	Liverpool–Trieste	RS; "Brazils" origin
1820	J.Eadie; R.Roberts	Miller & Co.	Liverpool–Trieste; London–Southern Fishery	LR; Foreign prize

Seal hunting voyage (1820–1821): On 8 September 1820 Messrs Cannan, Smith and Millars appointed Captain Thomas Hodges, late master of Aberdeen, to command of Salisbury to engage in seal hunting. He sailed from England on 15 September, bound for the South Shetland Islands. He arrived at New South Shetland in January 1821 and left on 16 February. Salisbury called at Buenos Aires and arrived in the Downs on 13 May and in the Thames by 22 May. She returned with 9000, or 9,821, or 8,926 seal skins.

Salisbury Bluff (62°41′S 60°27′W), the point forming the south side of the entrance to Las Palmas Cove in Hurd Peninsula, Livingston Island in the South Shetland Islands, is named for Salisbury.

Year	Master	Owner	Trade	Source
1821	Vanthusen	Craig	London–Sierra Leone	RS; Portugal origin; 1814 build year
1821	J.Hodge; J.Klug	Cannon	Liverpool–South Seas; London–Cape of Good Hope	RS; "Brazils" origin
1821	R.Roberts; J.Klug	Cannon	Liverpool–Southern Fishery; London–Cape of Good Hope	LR

Settler transport: On 14 August 1821 Captain James Saunders King sailed from London with 20 settlers from England to South Africa. These were a private party and not under the auspices of the Government Settler Scheme. Salisbury reached Table Bay, Cape Town on 8 December and arrived at Algoa Bay, Port Elizabeth, on 15 January 1822.

After delivering the settlers, Captain King and Salisbury traded between the Cape and Delagoa Bay. On a return trip to the Cape in 1823, Salisbury encountered a bad storm. King took the risk to cross the Bar, bringing her safely to anchor in the Bay of Natal. In 1824, King mapped the Bay and named the "Salisbury and Farewell Islands". In 1825, King settled in what would become the city of Durban.

Year	Master	Owner	Trade	Source
1823	J.S.King	Cannon	London–CGH	LR
1825	Garnett	Horsfall	Liverpool–Africa	RS; "Brazils" origin
1825	T.Bacon	Cannon	Dublin–Liverpool	LR

By 1825 the RS no longer listed the Salisbury of Portuguese origin; the other three Salisburys that had been present in 1821 were still listed. On 3 October 1825 a Salisbury was driven ashore and wrecked on Götaland, Sweden. She had been on a voyage from Liverpool, to Saint Petersburg.

Year	Master	Owner	Trade	Source
1827	Garnett	Horsfall	Liverpool–Africa	RS; "Brazils" origin
1827	T.Bacon	Cannon	Dublin–Liverpool	LR; foreign prize

== Fate ==
Salisbury, of Liverpool, was lost off Cape Mount, Africa, on 1 June 1827. Her crew survived. Lloyd's List gave the name of her master as Bryan.
