= Aberdeen (1811 ship) =

Trading ship launched in Quebec in 1811

History

United Kingdom
- Name: Aberdeen
- Port of registry: Quebec
- Builder: J. Henry & P. Leitch, Quebec
- Launched: 1811
- Fate: Last listed in 1820

General characteristics
- Tons burthen: 466, or 46624/94(bm)
- Length: 115 ft (35 m)
- Beam: 30 ft (9.1 m)

Aberdeen was launched at Quebec in 1811. She sailed to England and then traded between Quebec and Britain. She made two voyages to India under license from the British East India Company (EIC). After her return from the second, in 1820, she was no longer listed.

== Career ==
Aberdeen entered Lloyd's Register (LR) in 1812 with Main, master, J Auldjo, owner, and trade London. LR in 1813 showed her trade as London–Quebec. LR for 1815 showed her master as changing from Main to J. Allen. Lloyd's List (LL) for 24 November 1814 reported that Aberdeen had arrived in the Thames, having left Quebec on 29 September.

In 1813 the EIC lost its monopoly on the trade between India and Britain. British ships were then free to sail to India or the Indian Ocean under a license from the EIC.

A letter dated 29 February 1816 reported that she had been re-registered at London.

LR for 1816 showed Aberdeen's master changing from S.Allen to T.Fenwick, and her trade from London–Quebec to London–India.

In 1813 the EIC had lost its monopoly on the trade between India and Britain. British ships were then free to sail to India or the Indian Ocean under a licence from the EIC. On 16 February 1816 her owners applied for such a licence; they received it on 19 February.

In early 1816 Captain Fenwick sailed Aberdeen for Bombay under a license from the EIC.

After her return from India, Aberdeen made one or more voyages to Quebec. On 28 October 1817 she left Quebec and a month later arrived in the Downs.

LR for 1818 showed Aberdeen's master changing from Fenwick to Hodges, her owner from Maitland to I.S.Brancker, and her trade from London–Quebec to London–Île de France (Mauritius).

In 1818 Captain Hodges sailed from England for Île de France, again under a license from the EIC.

On 25 October 1818 Aberdeen, Hodges, master, sailed for Bengal. She arrived there on 1 April 1819.

Aberdeen, Hodges, master, sailing from Bengal for Buenos Aires and Liverpool, on 29 June 1819 put back to Bengal due to leaking. In June her crew refused to sail from Calcutta, arguing that she was leaky. The "Asiatic Journal and Monthly Register for British and Foreign..." criticised the crew for their refusal.

She sailed again for Buenos Aires on 12 August, but returned again twelve days later, having lost her anchors. On 13 January 1820 she arrived at Buenos Aires. She sailed from Buenos Aires on 27 March and arrived at Liverpool on 20 June 1820.

== Fate ==
On her return Captain Hodges left her. On 15 September 1820 he sailed Salisbury on a seal hunting voyage to the New South Shetlands. Aberdeen was no longer listed after 1820.
