= Hurd Ice Cap =

Ice cap in the South Shetland Islands

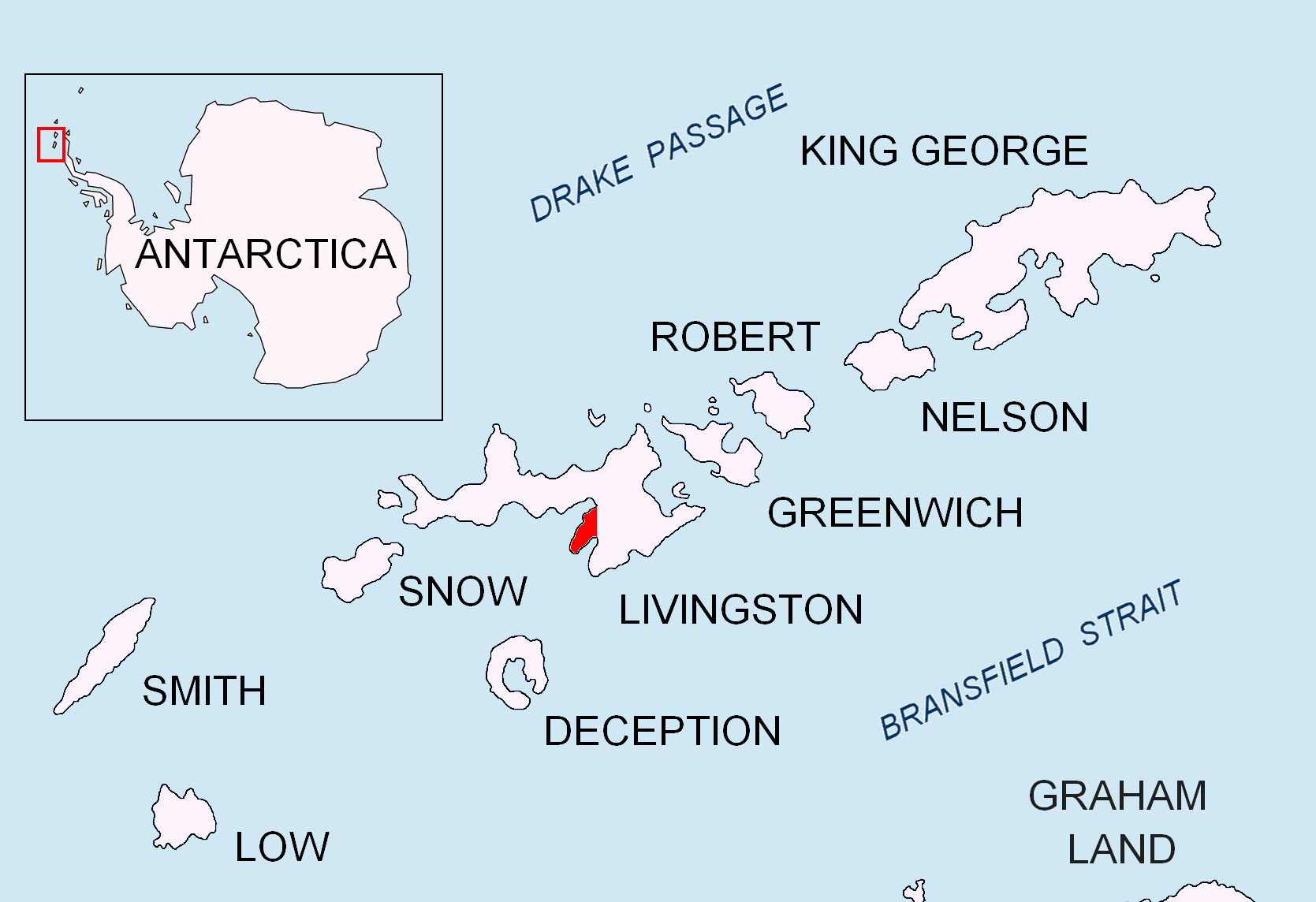
Location of Hurd Peninsula on Livingston Island in the South Shetland Islands.

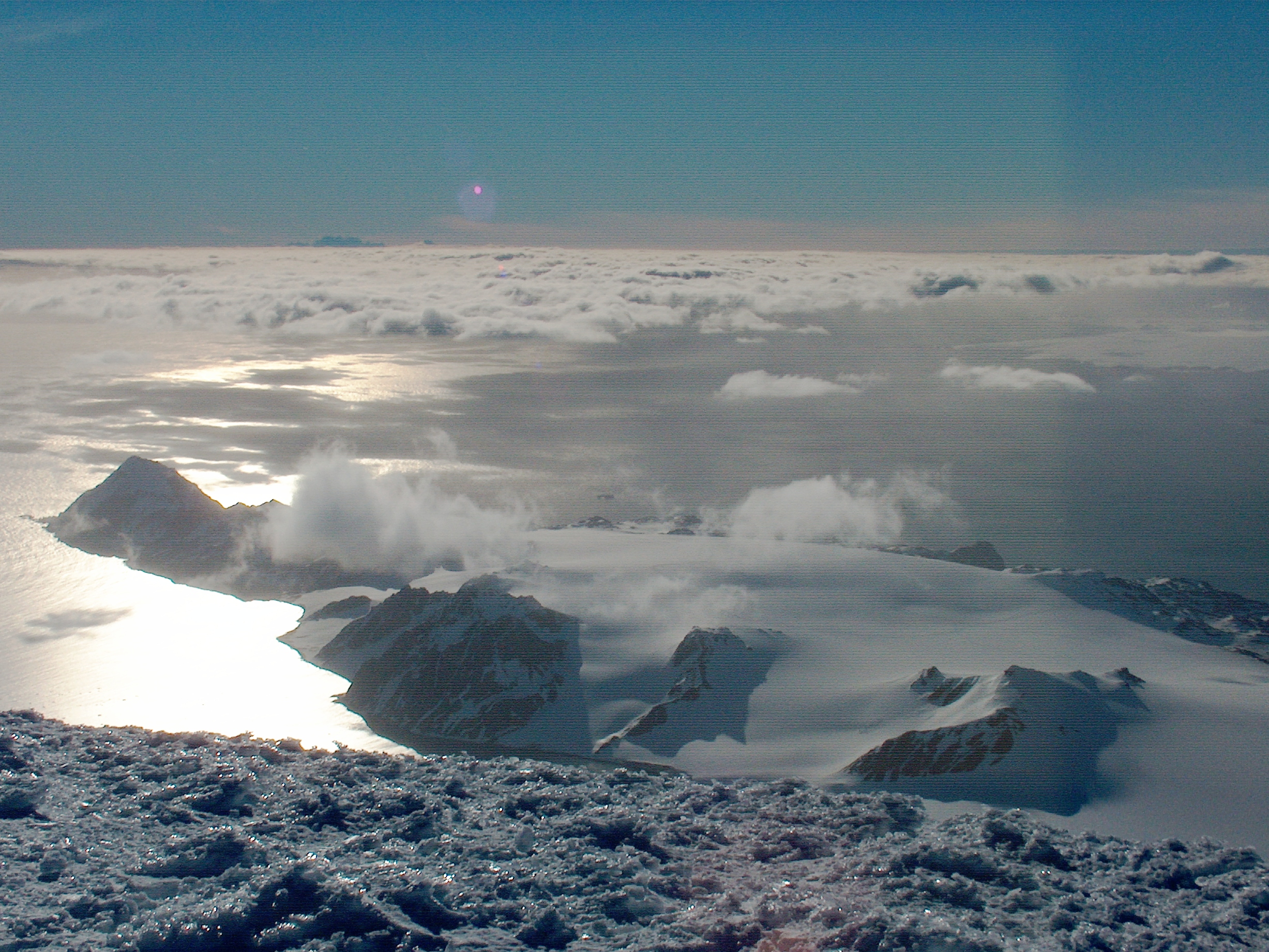
Hurd Ice Cap and southern Hurd Peninsula from Mount Friesland.

Topographic map of Livingston Island.

Hurd Ice Cap is the ice cap covering the central area of southern Hurd Peninsula, Livingston Island in the South Shetland Islands, Antarctica. It extends 4.5 km in northeast–southwest direction and 3.7 km in northwest–southeast direction, and drains both into South Bay to the northwest and into False Bay to the southeast. Its summit point has been nicknamed Dorotea by personnel of the nearby Spanish base Juan Carlos Primero and rises to 332 m.

The feature receives its name from Hurd Peninsula.

== Location ==
Dorotea Point is located at 62°41′0.3″S 60°22′06.3″W which is 5.33 km northeast of Miers Bluff and 4.45 km south of Hespérides Point (Detailed Spanish mapping in 1991, and Bulgarian mapping in 2005 and 2009).

== Maps ==
- Isla Livingston: Península Hurd. Mapa topográfico de escala 1:25000. Madrid: Servicio Geográfico del Ejército, 1991. (Map reproduced on p. 16 of the linked work)
- L.L. Ivanov et al. Antarctica: Livingston Island and Greenwich Island, South Shetland Islands. Scale 1:100000 topographic map. Sofia: Antarctic Place-names Commission of Bulgaria, 2005.
- L.L. Ivanov. Antarctica: Livingston Island and Greenwich, Robert, Snow and Smith Islands. Scale 1:120000 topographic map. Troyan: Manfred Wörner Foundation, 2009. ISBN 978-954-92032-6-4
- Antarctic Digital Database (ADD). Scale 1:250000 topographic map of Antarctica. Scientific Committee on Antarctic Research (SCAR). Since 1993, regularly upgraded and updated.
- L.L. Ivanov. Antarctica: Livingston Island and Smith Island. Scale 1:100000 topographic map. Manfred Wörner Foundation, 2017. ISBN 978-619-90008-3-0
