= Ballester Point =

Geographic point in Hurd Peninsula, Livingston Island

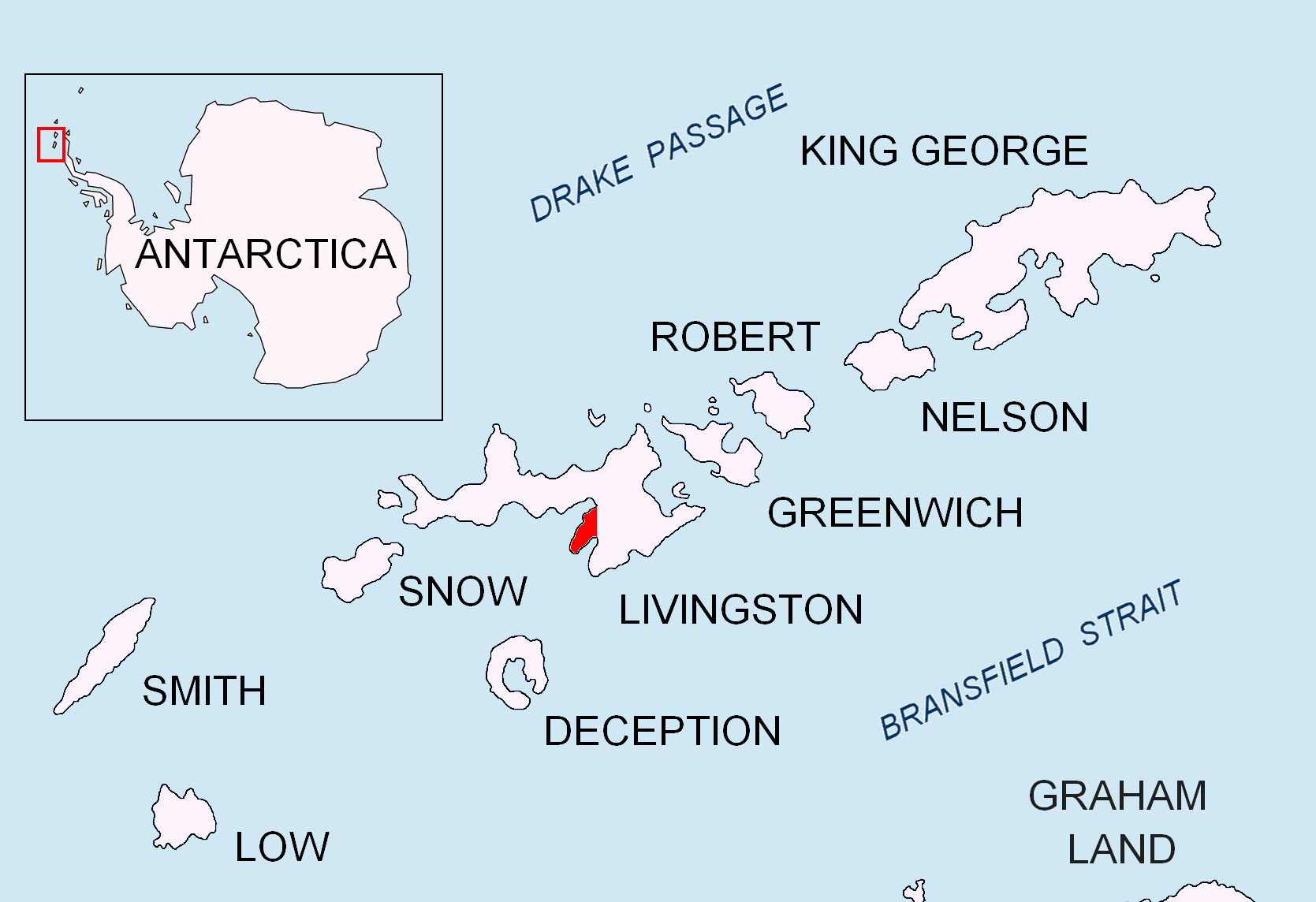
Location of Hurd Peninsula on Livingston Island in the South Shetland Islands.

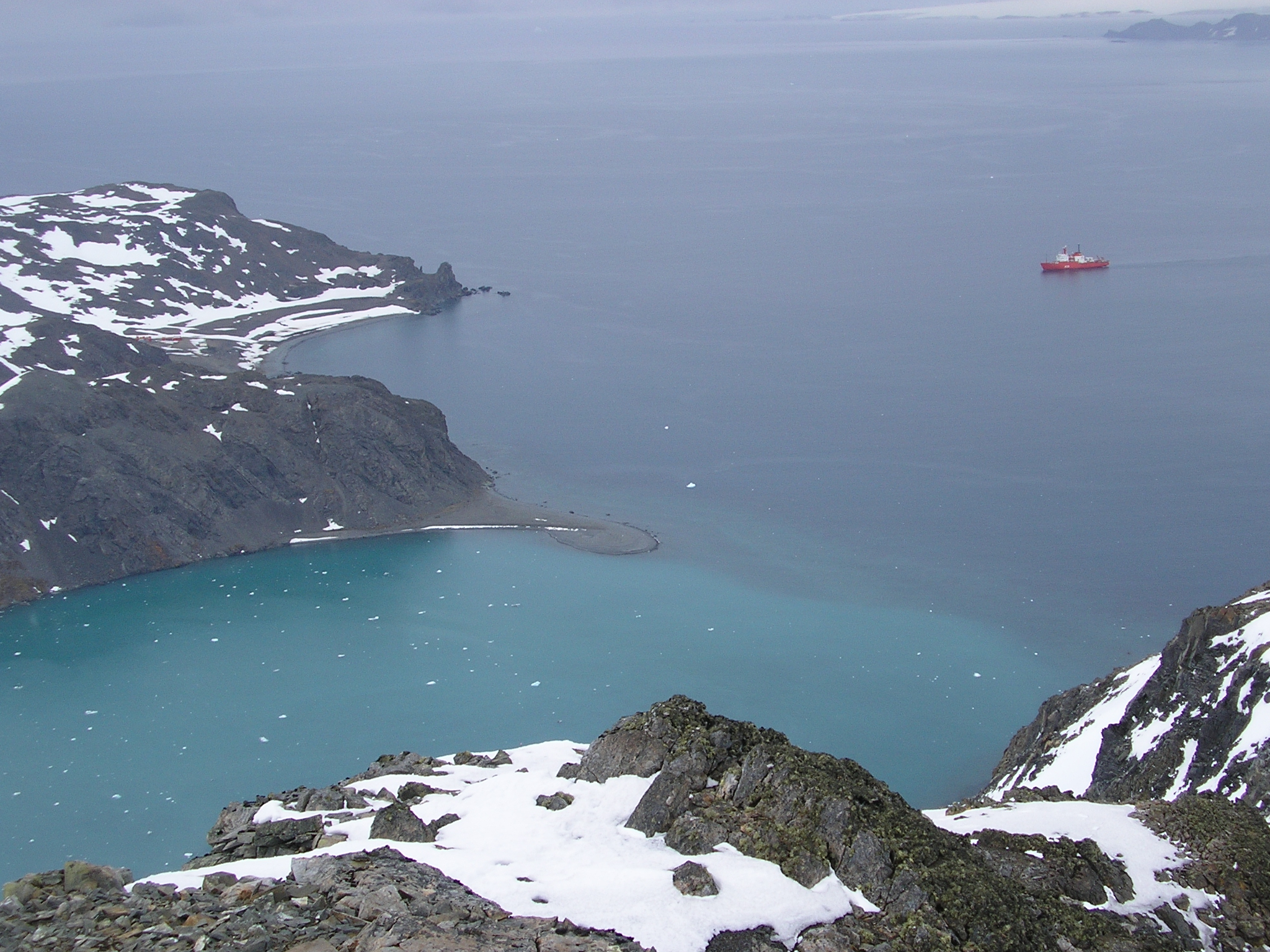
Ballester Point from Charrúa Ridge.

Topographic map of Livingston Island and Smith Island.

Ballester Point (Bulgarian: нос Балестер, ‘Nos Ballester’ \'nos ba-'les-ter\) is a point forming the south side of the entrance to Johnsons Dock and the northeast side of the entrance to Española Cove in Hurd Peninsula, Livingston Island in the South Shetland Islands, Antarctica. The area was visited by early 19th century sealers operating from Johnsons Dock.

The feature is named for Antonio Ballester, a doyen of the Spanish Antarctic Program.

== Location ==
The point is located at 62°39′28″S 60°22′31″W which is 4.95 km southwest of Ereby Point, 1.55 km south of Hespérides Point and 7.6 km north-northeast of Miers Bluff. (British mapping in 1822 and 1968, detailed Spanish mapping in 1991, Bulgarian mapping in 1996, 2005 and 2009).

== Maps ==
- Isla Livingston: Península Hurd. Mapa topográfico de escala 1:25000. Madrid: Servicio Geográfico del Ejército, 1991. (Map reproduced on p. 16 of the linked work)
- L.L. Ivanov. Livingston Island: Central-Eastern Region. Scale 1:25000 topographic map. Sofia: Antarctic Place-names Commission of Bulgaria, 1996.
- L.L. Ivanov et al., Antarctica: Livingston Island and Greenwich Island, South Shetland Islands (from English Strait to Morton Strait, with illustrations and ice-cover distribution), Scale 1: 100000 map, Antarctic Place-names Commission of Bulgaria, Ministry of Foreign Affairs, Sofia, 2005.
- L.L. Ivanov. Antarctica: Livingston Island and Greenwich, Robert, Snow and Smith Islands. Scale 1:120000 topographic map. Troyan: Manfred Wörner Foundation, 2009.
- Antarctic Digital Database (ADD). Scale 1:250000 topographic map of Antarctica. Scientific Committee on Antarctic Research (SCAR). Since 1993, regularly upgraded and updated.
- L.L. Ivanov. Antarctica: Livingston Island and Smith Island. Scale 1:100000 topographic map. Manfred Wörner Foundation, 2017. ISBN 978-619-90008-3-0
