= Hespérides Point =

Rocky point of land in the South Shetland Islands, Antarctica

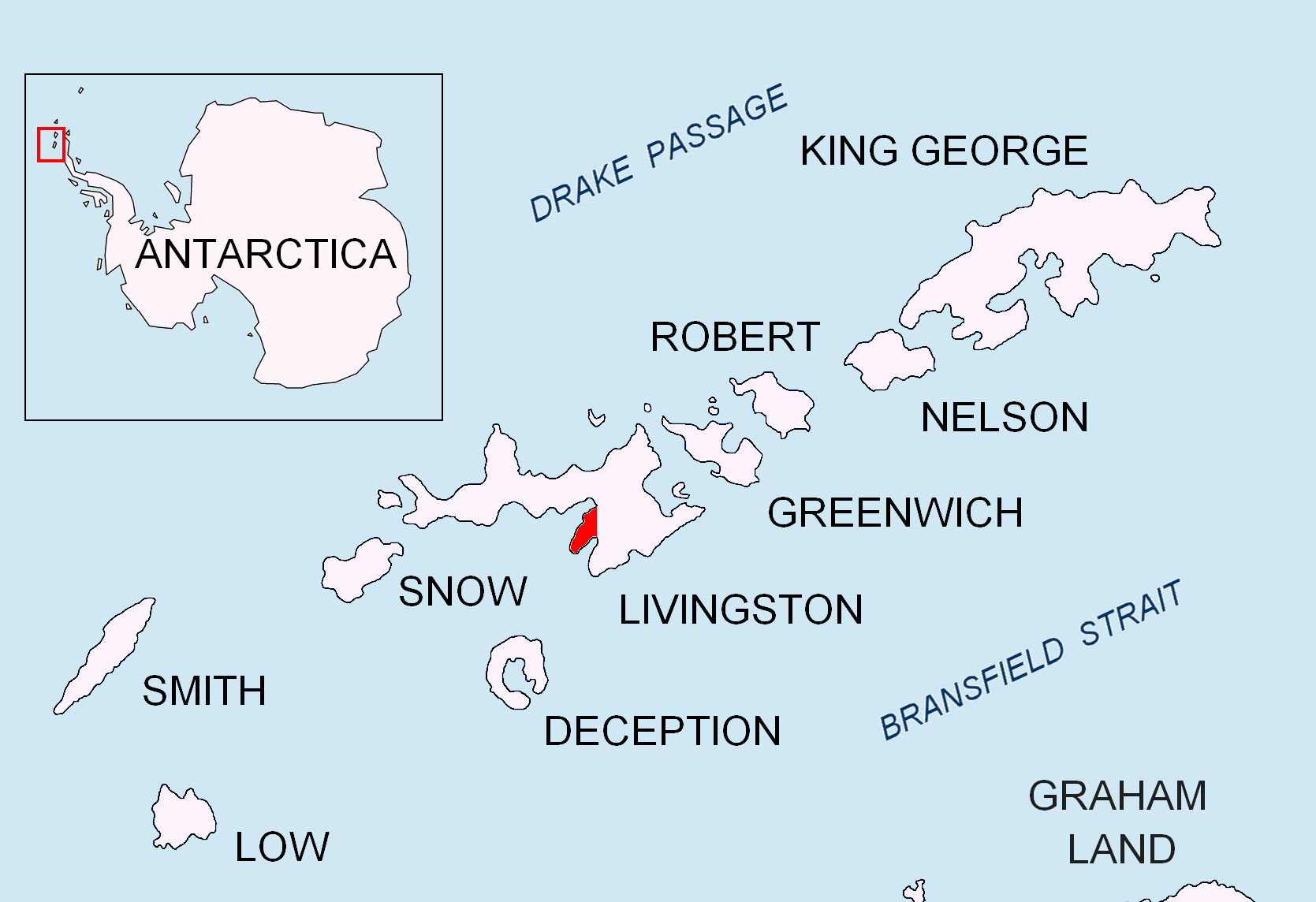
Location of Hurd Peninsula on Livingston Island in the South Shetland Islands.

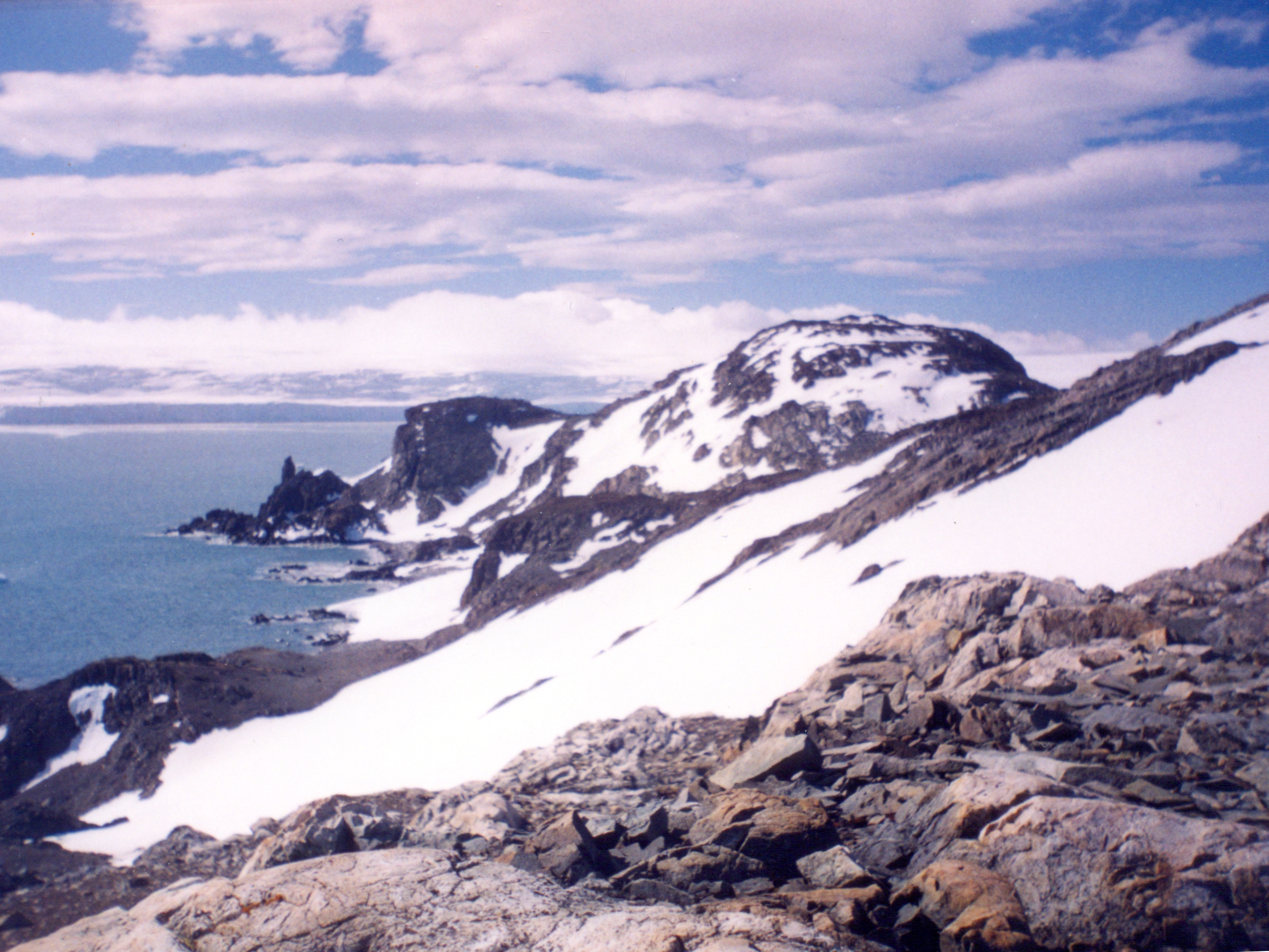
Hesperides Point from the west slopes of Atlantic Club Ridge.

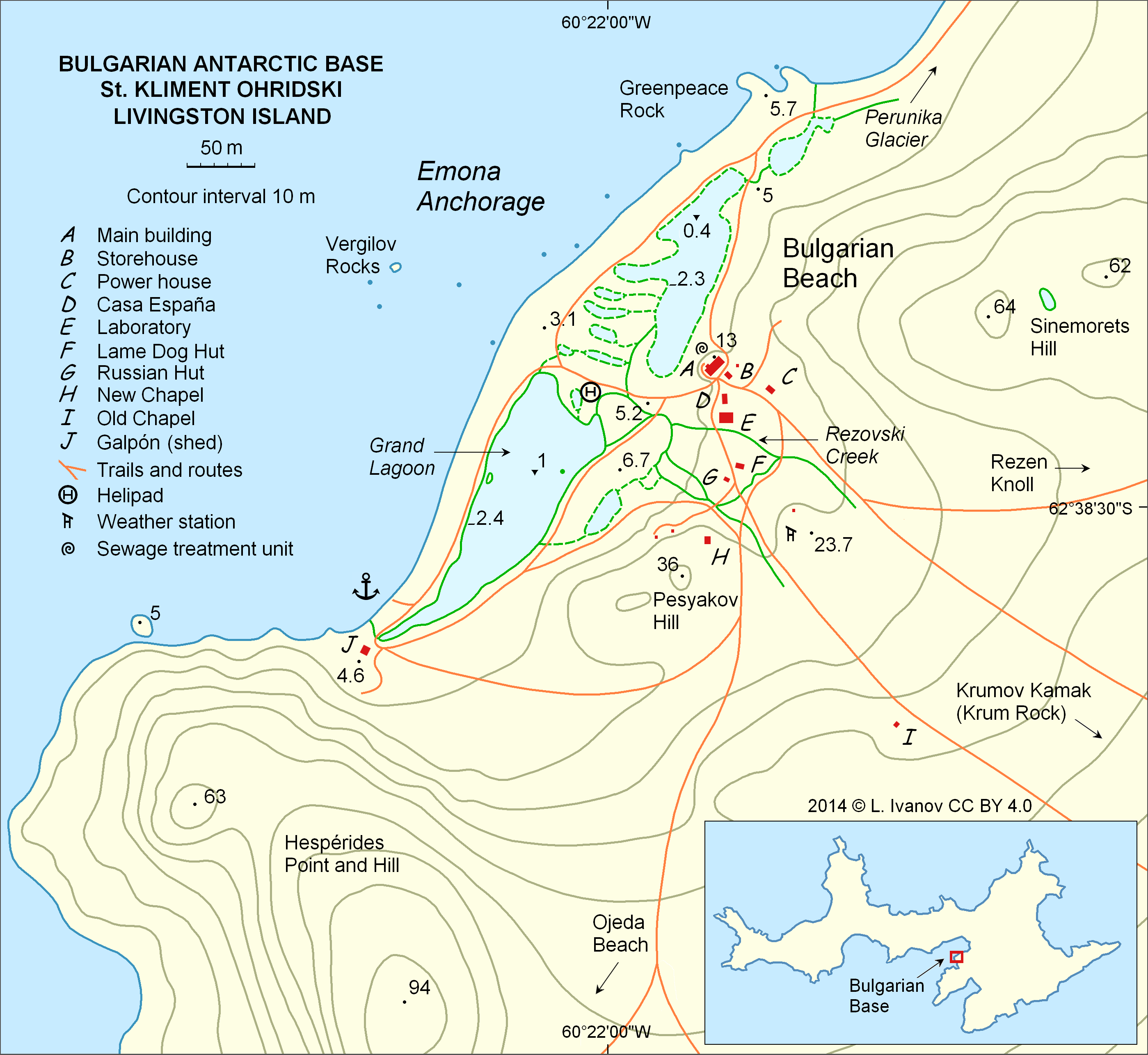
Topographic map of the Bulgarian Base area featuring Hespérides Point.

Topographic map of Livingston Island and Smith Island.

Hespérides Point (Spanish: Punta Hespérides) is a rocky point of land projecting into South Bay north-northwest of Johnsons Dock, Livingston Island in the South Shetland Islands, Antarctica and forming the southwest side of the entrance to Emona Anchorage. Surmounted by Hesperides Hill. The area was visited by 19th century sealers operating from nearby Johnsons Dock.

The feature is named after the Spanish ocean exploration ship BIO Hesperides.

== Location ==
The point is located at 62°38′36.7″S 60°22′23″W which is 12.36 km east-northeast of Hannah Point, 3.7 km southeast of Smolyan Point and 1.59 km north of Ballester Point (British mapping in 1968, detailed Spanish mapping in 1991 and Bulgarian mapping in 1996, 2005 and 2009).

== Maps ==
- Isla Livingston: Península Hurd. Mapa topográfico de escala 1:25 000. Madrid: Servicio Geográfico del Ejército, 1991.
- L.L. Ivanov. Livingston Island: Central-Eastern Region. Scale 1:25000 topographic map. Sofia: Antarctic Place-names Commission of Bulgaria, 1996.
- L.L. Ivanov et al. Antarctica: Livingston Island and Greenwich Island, South Shetland Islands. Scale 1:100000 topographic map. Sofia: Antarctic Place-names Commission of Bulgaria, 2005.
- L.L. Ivanov. Antarctica: Livingston Island and Greenwich, Robert, Snow and Smith Islands. Scale 1:120000 topographic map. Troyan: Manfred Wörner Foundation, 2009. ISBN 978-954-92032-6-4
- Bulgarian Base (Sheet 1 and Sheet 2): Antarctica, South Shetland Islands, Livingston Island. Scale 1:2000 topographic map. Sofia: Military Geographic Service, 2016. (in Bulgarian, map images on slides 6 and 7 of the linked report)
