= Johnsons Dock =

Cove on Livingston Island in the South Shetland Islands, Antarctica

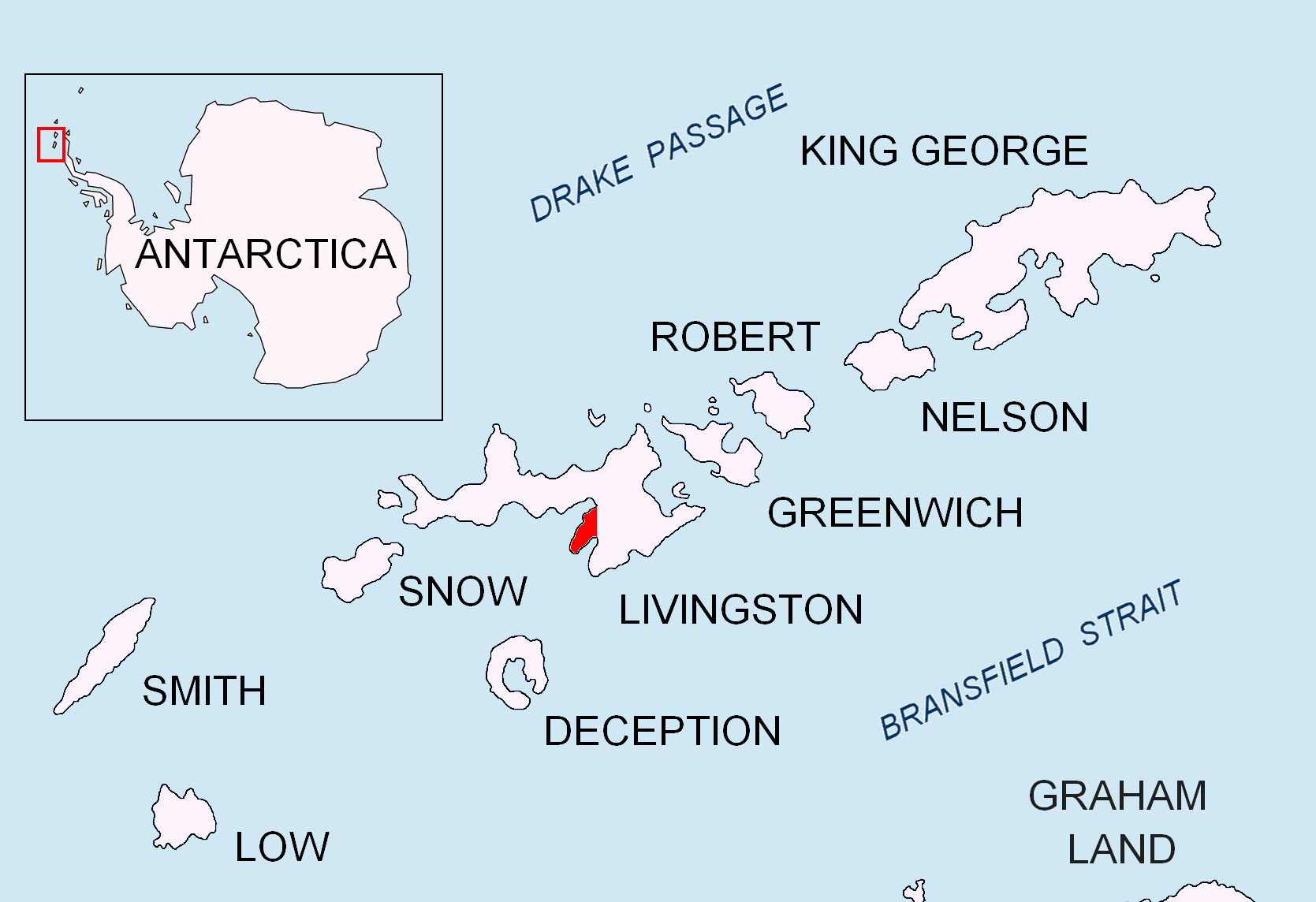
Location of Hurd Peninsula in the South Shetland Islands

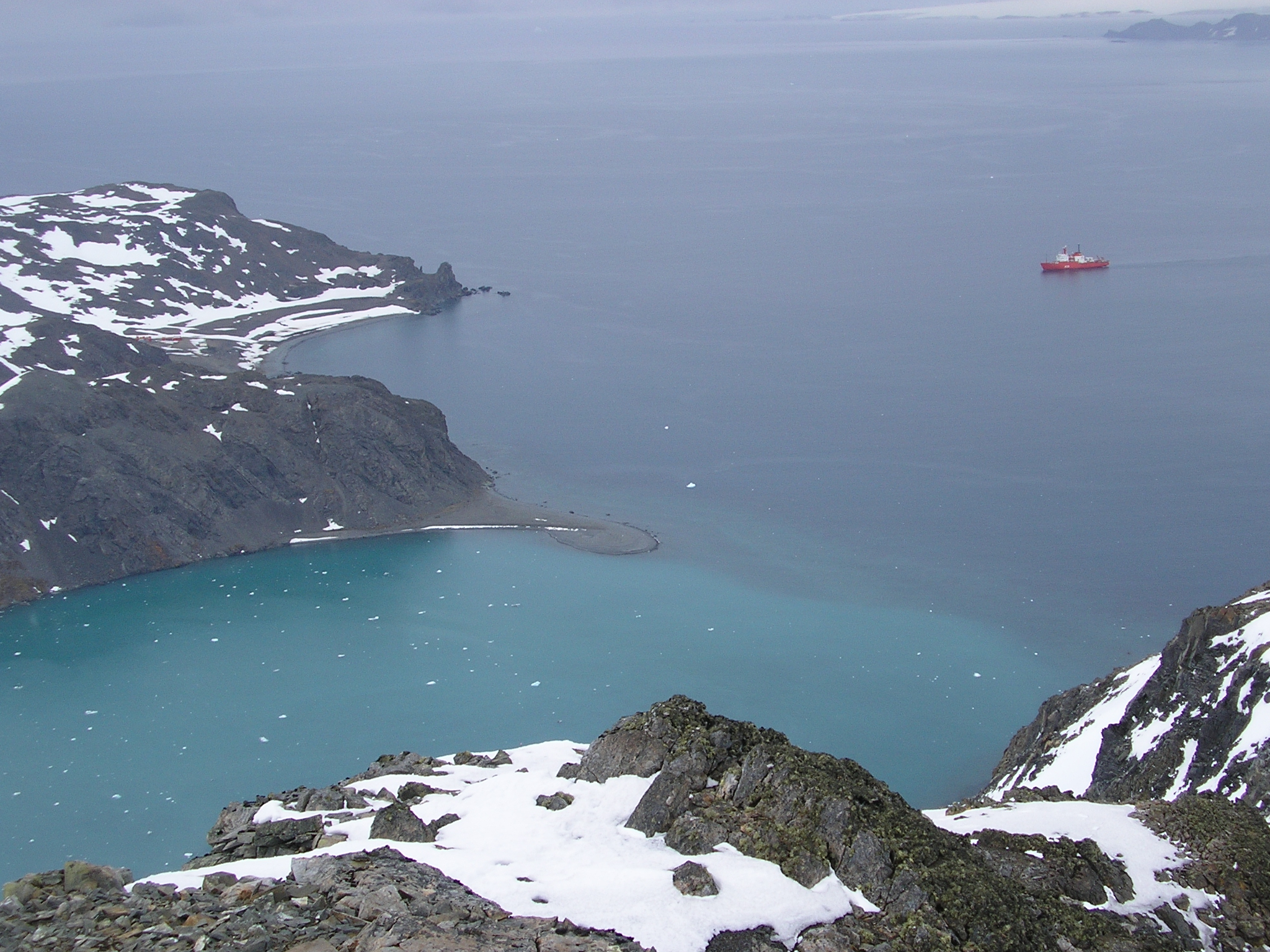
Johnsons Dock from Charrúa Ridge

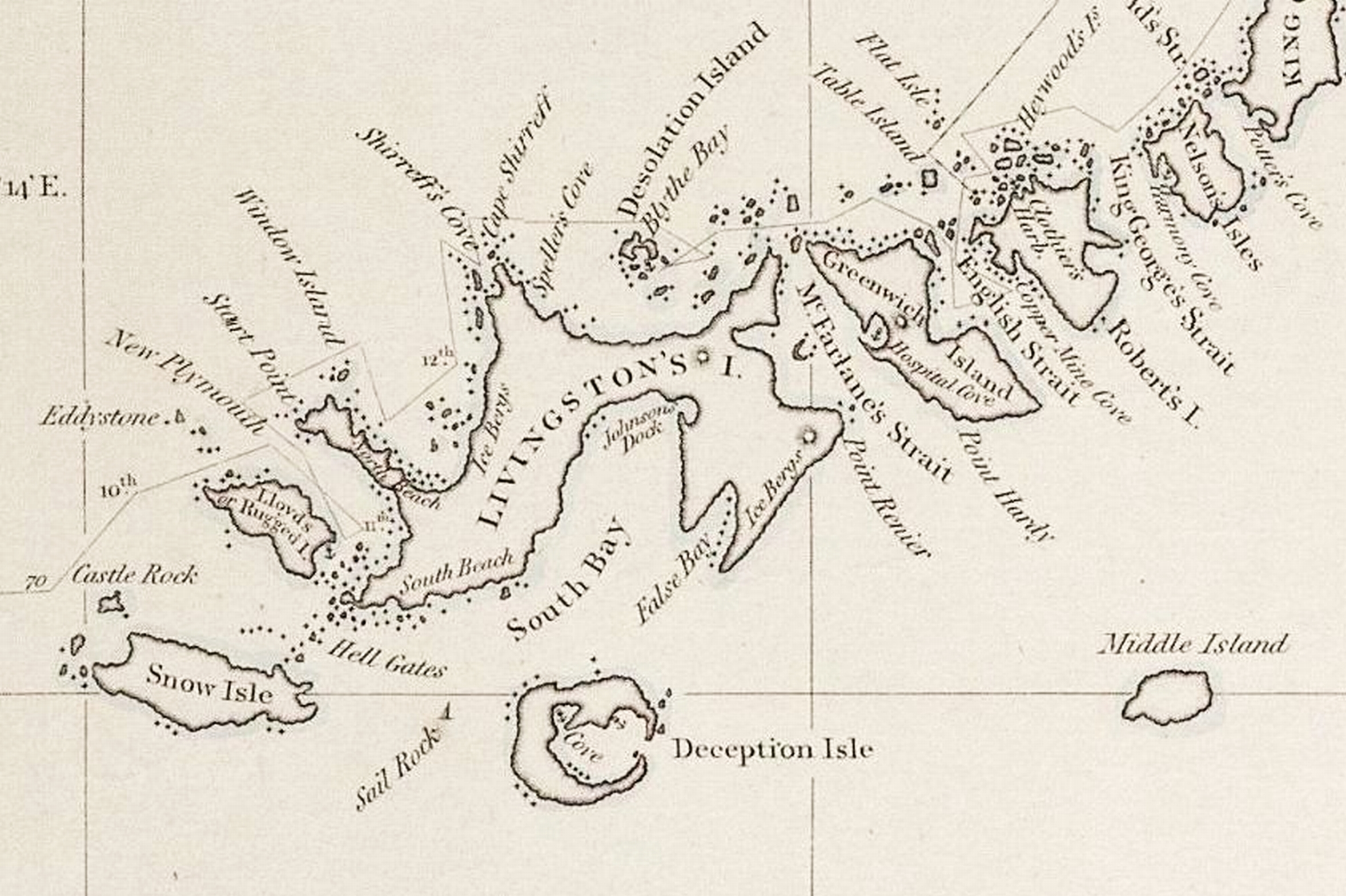
Fragment of George Powell's 1822 chart of the South Shetland Islands and South Orkney Islands featuring Johnsons Dock

Topographic map of Livingston Island and Smith Island

Johnsons Dock is a sheltered 500 m wide cove indenting for 900 m the northwest coast of Hurd Peninsula on Livingston Island in the South Shetland Islands, Antarctica. It is part of South Bay entered north of Ballester Point. Surmounted by Charrúa Ridge on the northeast. The cove was frequented by early 19th century sealers.

The feature is probably named after Captain Thomas Johnson, Master of the British brig Mellona or Captain Robert Johnson, Master of the American sealing ship Jane Maria and of the schooner Wasp, who visited the South Shetland Islands in the first seasons after their discovery.

== Location ==
The cove's midpoint is located at 62°39′37.4″S 60°22′03″W which is 1.9 km south-southeast of Hespérides Point. British early mapping in 1822 and 1968, detailed Spanish mapping in 1991, Bulgarian mapping in 1996, 2005 and 2009.

== Maps ==
- Chart of South Shetland including Coronation Island, &c. from the exploration of the sloop Dove in the years 1821 and 1822 by George Powell Commander of the same. Scale ca. 1:200000. London: Laurie, 1822.
- Isla Livingston: Península Hurd. Mapa topográfico de escala 1:25000. Madrid: Servicio Geográfico del Ejército, 1991. (Map reproduced on p. 16 of the linked work)
- L.L. Ivanov. Livingston Island: Central-Eastern Region. Scale 1:25000 topographic map. Sofia: Antarctic Place-names Commission of Bulgaria, 1996.
- L.L. Ivanov et al. Antarctica: Livingston Island and Greenwich Island, South Shetland Islands. Scale 1:100000 topographic map. Sofia: Antarctic Place-names Commission of Bulgaria, 2005.
- L.L. Ivanov. Antarctica: Livingston Island and Greenwich, Robert, Snow and Smith Islands. Scale 1:120000 topographic map. Troyan: Manfred Wörner Foundation, 2010. ISBN 978-954-92032-9-5 (First edition 2009. ISBN 978-954-92032-6-4)
- Antarctic Digital Database (ADD). Scale 1:250000 topographic map of Antarctica. Scientific Committee on Antarctic Research (SCAR). Since 1993, regularly upgraded and updated.
- L.L. Ivanov. Antarctica: Livingston Island and Smith Island. Scale 1:100000 topographic map. Manfred Wörner Foundation, 2017. ISBN 978-619-90008-3-0
