= Miers Bluff =

Geographic feature on South Shetland Islands archipelago, Antarctica

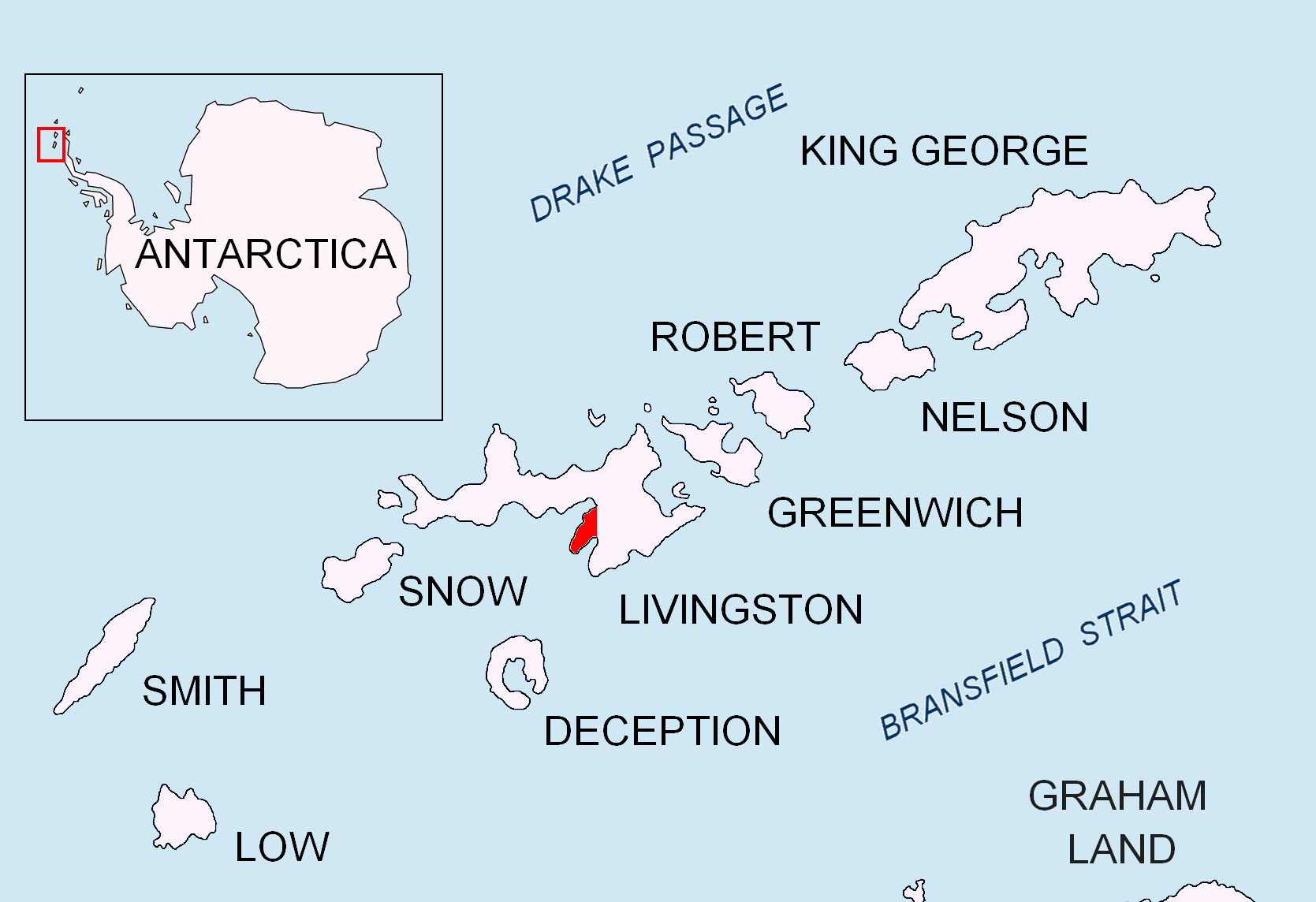
Location of Hurd Peninsula, Livingston Island in the South Shetland Islands.

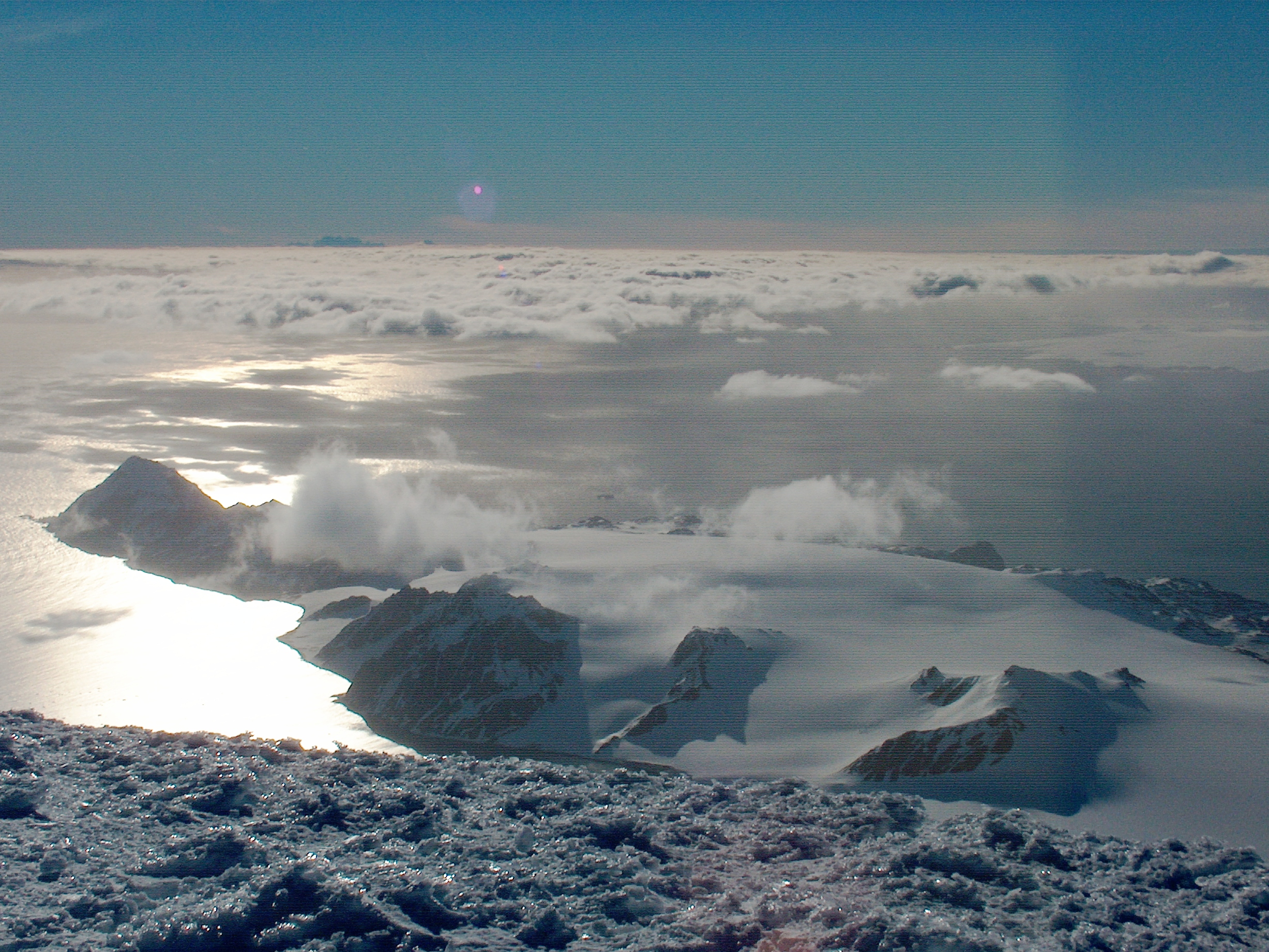
Miers Bluff (on the left) from Mount Friesland.

Topographic map of Livingston Island and Smith Island

Miers Bluff is the point forming the southwest extremity of Hurd Peninsula, the southeast side of the entrance to South Bay and the northwest side of the entrance to False Bay, on Livingston Island in the South Shetland Islands, Antarctica. The name "Elephant Point", given by Robert Fildes in 1820–22 to another feature, has been for a number of years applied in error to this bluff. It is now approved as originally intended and a new name has been substituted for the feature here described.

The point is named after John Miers, British engineer and botanist who travelled to Chile in 1818 and was responsible for the publication in 1820 of the first chart of the South Shetland Islands, based on the work of William Smith.

== Location ==
The point is located at (62°43′12.3″S 60°26′11.3″W) which is 6.6 kilometres (4.1 mi) northwest of Barnard Point, 11.5 kilometres (7.1 mi) southeast of Hannah Point and 7.8 kilometres (4.8 mi) southwest of Napier Peak (British mapping in 1968, detailed Spanish mapping in 1991, and Bulgarian mapping in 2005 and 2009). The U.S. Geological Survey gives the location as 62°43′S 60°27′W.

== Maps ==
- Isla Livingston: Península Hurd. Mapa topográfico de escala 1:25 000. Madrid: Servicio Geográfico del Ejército, 1991.
- L.L. Ivanov et al. Antarctica: Livingston Island and Greenwich Island, South Shetland Islands. Scale 1:100000 topographic map. Sofia: Antarctic Place-names Commission of Bulgaria, 2005.
- L.L. Ivanov. Antarctica: Livingston Island and Greenwich, Robert, Snow and Smith Islands. Scale 1:120000 topographic map. Troyan: Manfred Wörner Foundation, 2010. ISBN 978-954-92032-9-5 (First edition 2009. ISBN 978-954-92032-6-4)
- Antarctic Digital Database (ADD). Scale 1:250000 topographic map of Antarctica. Scientific Committee on Antarctic Research (SCAR). Since 1993, regularly upgraded and updated.
- L.L. Ivanov. Antarctica: Livingston Island and Smith Island. Scale 1:100000 topographic map. Manfred Wörner Foundation, 2017. ISBN 978-619-90008-3-0
