= South Bay (Livingston Island) =

Bay in the South Shetland Islands, Antarctica

Location of Livingston Island in the South Shetland Islands

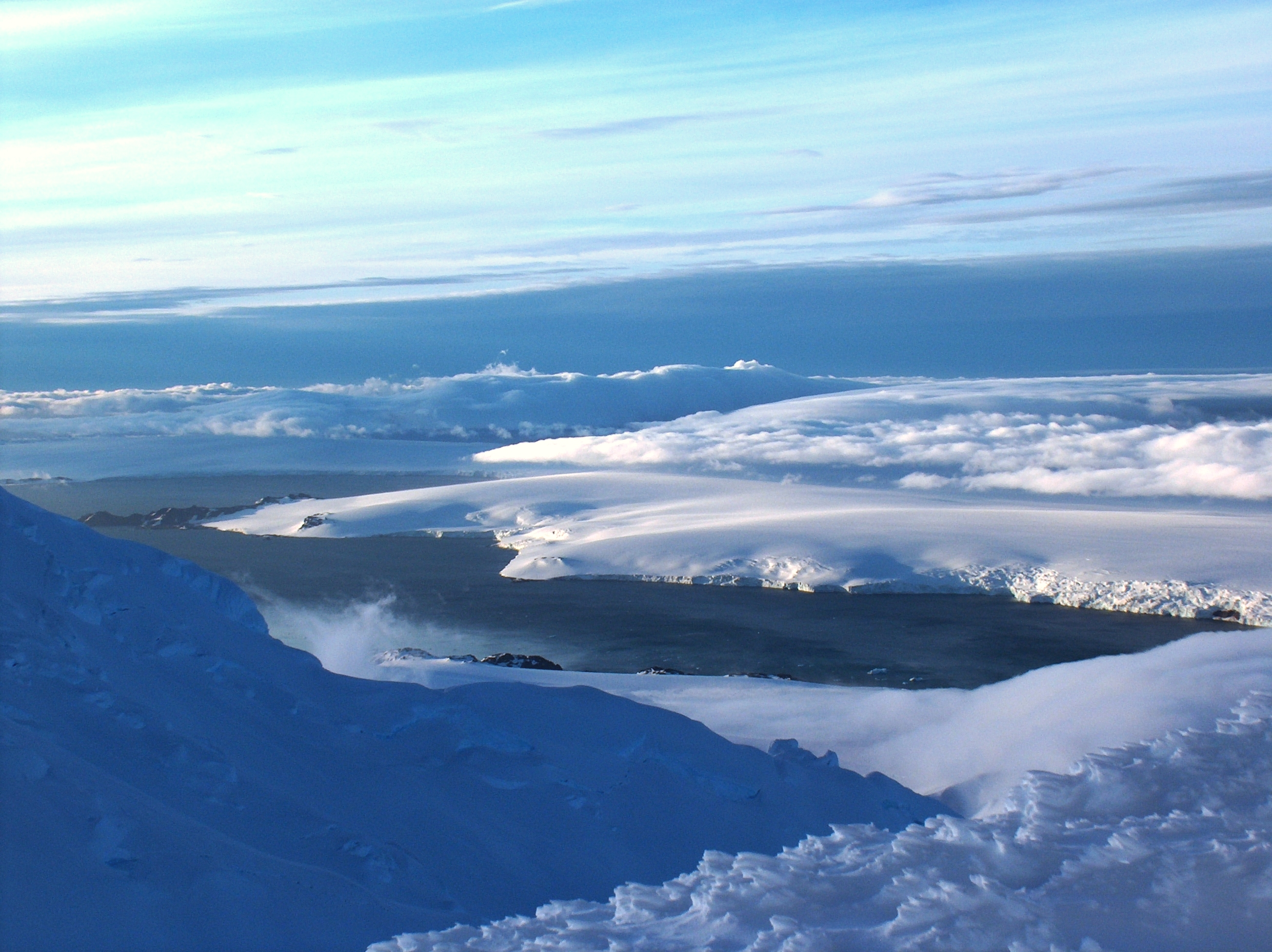
South Bay from Lyaskovets Peak

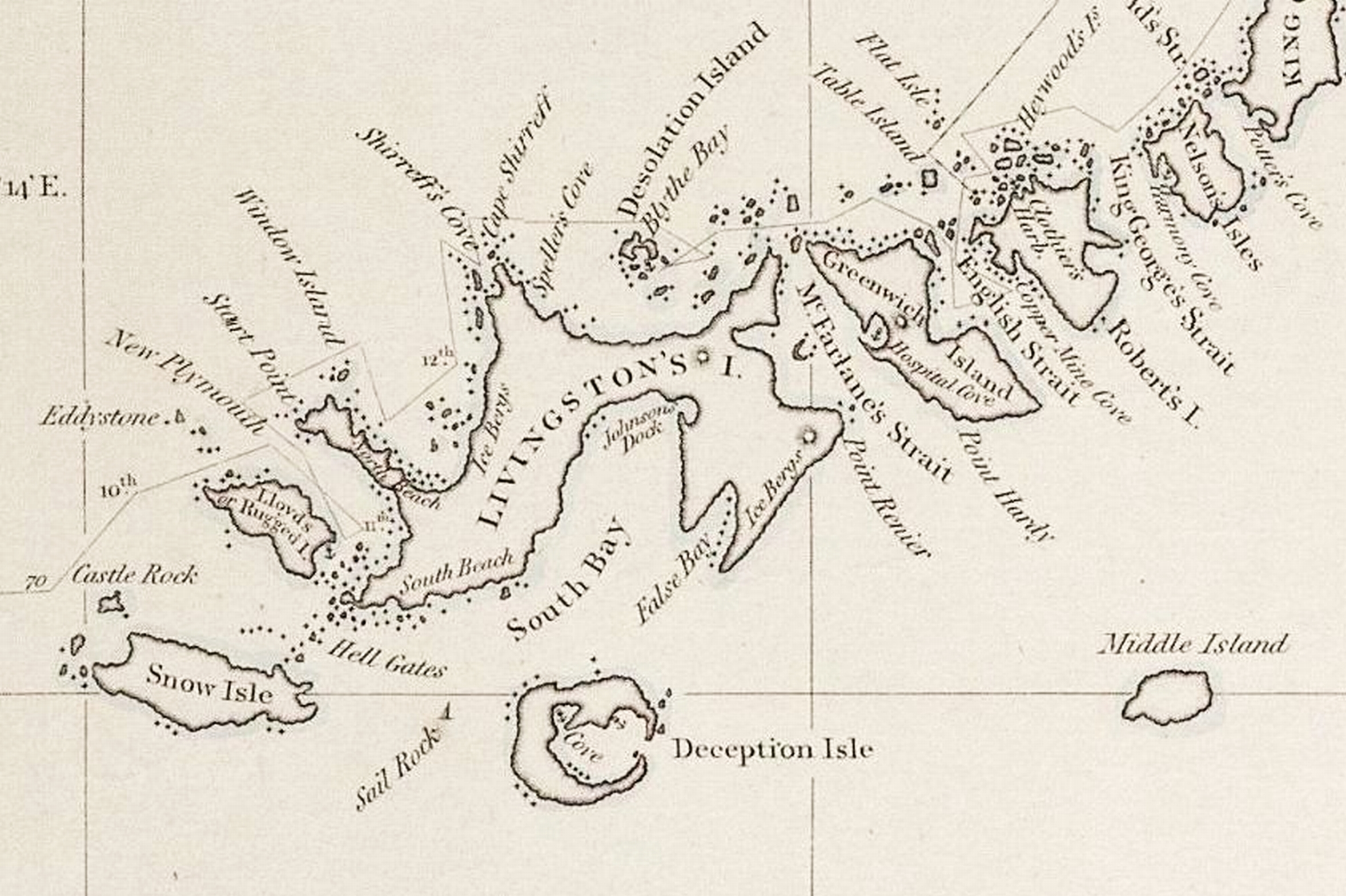
Fragment of George Powell's 1822 chart of the South Shetland Islands and South Orkney Islands featuring South Bay

Topographic map of Livingston Island

South Bay (62°40′S 60°28′W) is a 11.6 kilometres (7.2 mi) wide bay indenting for 12.5 kilometres (7.8 mi) the south coast of Livingston Island in the South Shetland Islands, Antarctica. The bay is lying northwest of False Bay and east of Walker Bay, and is entered between Hannah Point and Miers Bluff. The glaciers Kamchiya, Pimpirev, Perunika, Contell, Johnsons and Hurd Ice Cap feed the bay.

South Bay was known to both American and British sealers as early as 1820, and the name has been well established in international usage for over 100 years.

== Maps ==
- Chart of South Shetland including Coronation Island, &c. from the exploration of the sloop Dove in the years 1821 and 1822 by George Powell Commander of the same. Scale ca. 1:200000. London: Laurie, 1822.
- South Shetland Islands. Scale 1:200000 topographic map No. 5657. DOS 610 – W 62 60. Tolworth, UK, 1968.
- Islas Livingston y Decepción. Mapa topográfico a escala 1:100000. Madrid: Servicio Geográfico del Ejército, 1991.
- L.L. Ivanov et al. Antarctica: Livingston Island and Greenwich Island, South Shetland Islands. Scale 1:100000 topographic map. Sofia: Antarctic Place-names Commission of Bulgaria, 2005.
- L.L. Ivanov. Antarctica: Livingston Island and Greenwich, Robert, Snow and Smith Islands. Scale 1:120000 topographic map. Troyan: Manfred Wörner Foundation, 2009. ISBN 978-954-92032-6-4
- Antarctic Digital Database (ADD). Scale 1:250000 topographic map of Antarctica. Scientific Committee on Antarctic Research (SCAR). Since 1993, regularly upgraded and updated.
- L.L. Ivanov. Antarctica: Livingston Island and Smith Island. Scale 1:100000 topographic map. Manfred Wörner Foundation, 2017. ISBN 978-619-90008-3-0
