= Pimpirev Beach =

Beach in Antarctica

Location of Livingston Island in the South Shetland Islands.

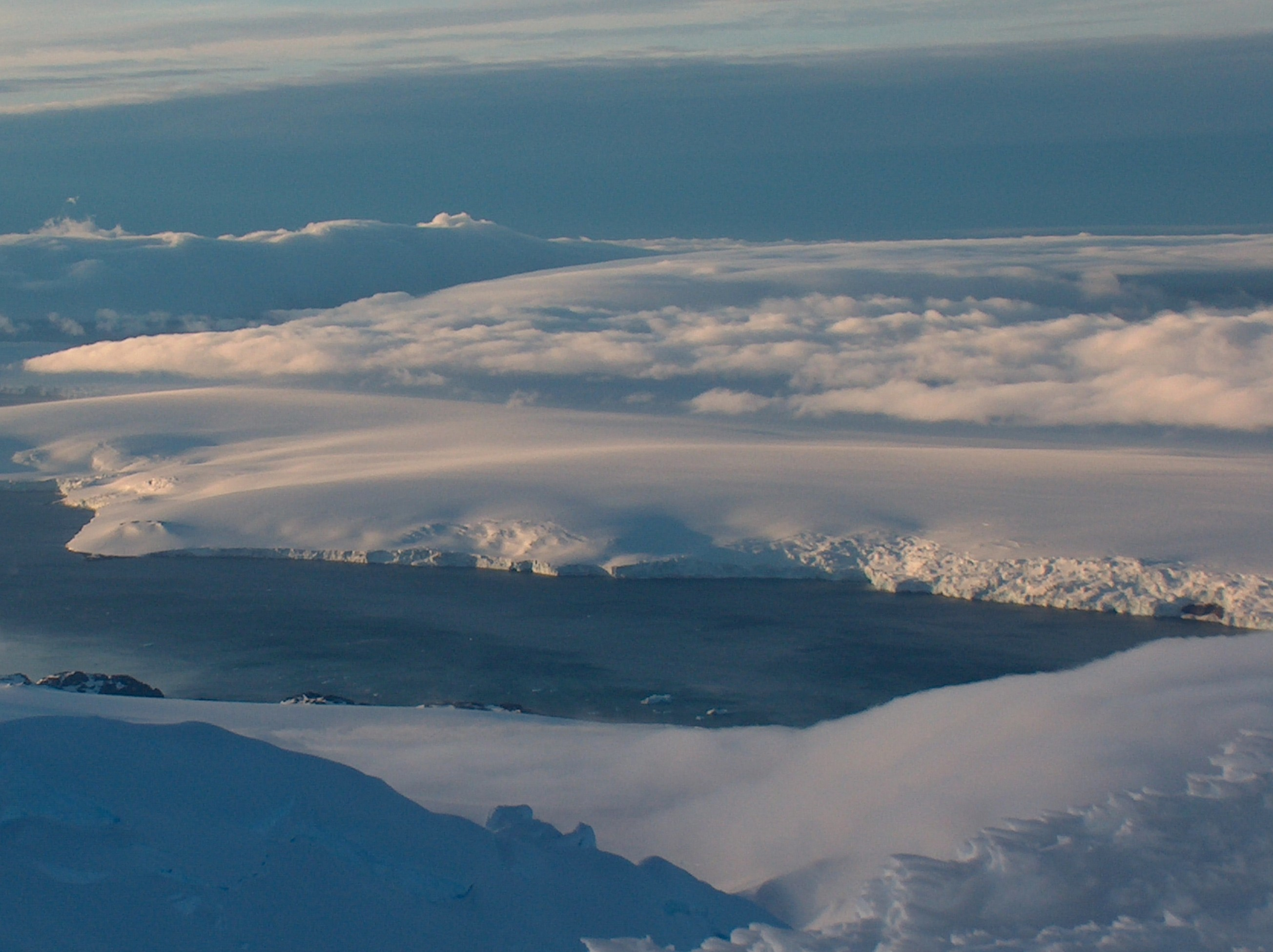
Pimpirev Beach from Lyaskovets Peak.

Topographic map of Livingston Island, Greenwich, Robert, Snow and Smith Islands.

Pimpirev Beach (Bulgarian: Пимпирев бряг, romanized: Pimpirev bryag, IPA: [pimˈpirɛv ˈbrʲak]) is the portion of the northwest coast of South Bay, Livingston Island, Antarctica bounded to the southwest by Ereby Point and to the northeast by the north corner of the bay marked by an ice sea cave located 5.8 km east-northeast of Ereby Point and 1.45 km northwest of Aleko Point.

The shoreline, extending 6.5 km in a west-southwest to east-northeast direction, is formed by a narrow beach under the Pimpirev Glacier’s terminus; a number of minor disruptions occur with segments of the ice cap penetrating the sea. Featuring Smolyan Point, a cape located 1.9 km northeast of Ereby Point and ending up with a 25 m wide and 4 m high rock, with conspicuous radial crevasses spreading inland. The central portion of the coast is indented for 250 m by a nameless 710 m wide cove behind Rongel Reef.

The beach takes its name from the adjacent Pimpirev Ice Wall, respectively Pimpirev Glacier.

== Location ==
The beach midpoint is located at 62°37′11″S 60°24′50″W (Detailed Spanish mapping in 1991, Bulgarian remapping in 1996, 2005 and 2009 of the coastal configuration modified by recent glacier retreat).

== Maps ==
- L.L. Ivanov. Livingston Island: Central-Eastern Region. Scale 1:25000 topographic map. Sofia: Antarctic Place-names Commission of Bulgaria, 1996.
- L.L. Ivanov et al. Antarctica: Livingston Island and Greenwich Island, South Shetland Islands. Scale 1:100000 topographic map. Sofia: Antarctic Place-names Commission of Bulgaria, 2005.
- L.L. Ivanov. Antarctica: Livingston Island and Greenwich, Robert, Snow and Smith Islands. Scale 1:120000 topographic map. Troyan: Manfred Wörner Foundation, 2009. ISBN 978-954-92032-6-4
