= Rongel =

Rongel may refer to:

- Rongel Point
- Rongel Reef
- Ary Rongel (H-44)
