= Atanasova Point =

Location of Livingston Island in the South Shetland Islands

Topographic map featuring Atanasova Point

Atanasova Point (Bulgarian: нос Атанасова, ‘Nos Atanasova’ \'nos a-ta-'na-so-va\) is the ice-free tipped point on the north coast of Livingston Island projecting 450 m northwards into Hero Bay. It is named after Tsvetelina Atanasova (1960-2018), participant in the Bulgarian Antarctic campaigns in 2009/10 and subsequent seasons.

== Location ==
Atanasova Point is located at 62°34′18″S 60°31′46″W, which is 2.4 km east of Kuklen Point, 5.7 km southwest of Siddins Point, 3.27 km west by south of Lukovit Point, 8 km northwest of Ereby Point and 10.2 km north-northeast of Hannah Point. British mapping in 1968, and Bulgarian in 2005, 2009 and 2017.

== Maps ==
- L.L. Ivanov et al. Antarctica: Livingston Island and Greenwich Island, South Shetland Islands. Scale 1:100000 topographic map. Sofia: Antarctic Place-names Commission of Bulgaria, 2005.
- L.L. Ivanov. Antarctica: Livingston Island and Greenwich, Robert, Snow and Smith Islands. Scale 1:120000 topographic map. Troyan: Manfred Wörner Foundation, 2009.
- Antarctic Digital Database (ADD). Scale 1:250000 topographic map of Antarctica. Scientific Committee on Antarctic Research (SCAR). Since 1993, regularly upgraded and updated
