= Kuklen Point =

Coordinates: 62°34′23″S 60°34′34″W

Location of Livingston Island in the South Shetland Islands

Topographic map of Livingston Island and Smith Island

Kuklen Point (Bulgarian: нос Куклен, ‘Nos Kuklen’ \'nos 'kuk-len\) is a point forming the east side of the entrance to Skravena Cove on the coast of Hero Bay, Livingston Island, South Shetland Islands. It is situated 2.13 km southeast of Avitohol Point, 5.6 km west of Lukovit Point and 2.4 km west of Atanasova Point. Bulgarian early mapping in 2009. Named after the town of Kuklen in southern Bulgaria.

== Maps ==
- L.L. Ivanov et al., Antarctica: Livingston Island and Greenwich Island, South Shetland Islands (from English Strait to Morton Strait, with illustrations and ice-cover distribution), Scale 1: 100000 map, Antarctic Place-names Commission of Bulgaria, Ministry of Foreign Affairs, Sofia, 2005
- L.L. Ivanov. Antarctica: Livingston Island and Greenwich, Robert, Snow and Smith Islands. Scale 1:120000 topographic map. Troyan: Manfred Wörner Foundation, 2009. ISBN 978-954-92032-6-4
- Antarctic Digital Database (ADD). Scale 1:250000 topographic map of Antarctica. Scientific Committee on Antarctic Research (SCAR). Since 1993, regularly upgraded and updated.
- L.L. Ivanov. Antarctica: Livingston Island and Smith Island. Scale 1:100000 topographic map. Manfred Wörner Foundation, 2017. ISBN 978-619-90008-3-0
