= Ice wall =

Ice wall is the edge of an ice shelf. It may also refer to:

- Antarctica, believed by some of the flat Earthers to be the edge of the world
- IceWall SSO, a Web and Federated single sign-on software
- Pimpirev Ice Wall, Livingston Island, Antarctica
- The Wall, a 700 foot tall structure made out of ice in the fictional world of A Song of Ice and Fire series of novels by George R. R. Martin and its adaptations
