= Belev Nunatak =

Antarctic nunatak

Location of Livingston Island in the South Shetland Islands

Belev Nunatak (Bulgarian: Белев нунатак, romanized: Belev nunatak, IPA: ['bɛlɛv 'nunɐtak]) is the hill rising to 58 m on the small peninsula ending in Avitohol Point on the north coast of Livingston Island in the South Shetland Islands, Antarctica. It has a partly ice-free area of 0.25 ha extending 80 m in west–east direction and 60 m in south–north direction. The nunatak surmounts Hero Bay on the northeast, and is part of the glacial divide between Tundzha Glacier on the southeast and Berkovitsa Glacier on the west. The area was visited by early 19th century sealers.

The feature is named after Krasimir Belev, builder at the Bulgarian base St. Kliment Ohridski in 1995/96 and subsequent seasons, and participant in the first topographic survey of the base area from 31 January to 4 February 1996.

== Location ==
Belev Nunatak is centred at 62°34′11″S 60°37′22.8″W, which is 2.3 km northeast of Snow Peak and 750 m south-southwest of Avitohol Point. British mapping of the area in 1968 and Bulgarian in 2009 and 2017.

== Maps ==
Topographic map of Livingston Island and Smith Island

- Livingston Island to King George Island. Scale 1:200000. Admiralty Nautical Chart 1776. Taunton: UK Hydrographic Office, 1968
- South Shetland Islands. Scale 1:200000 topographic map No. 3373. DOS 610 - W 62 58. Tolworth, UK, 1968
- L. Ivanov. Antarctica: Livingston Island and Greenwich, Robert, Snow and Smith Islands. Scale 1:120000 topographic map. Troyan: Manfred Wörner Foundation, 2010. ISBN 978-954-92032-9-5 (First edition 2009. ISBN 978-954-92032-6-4)
- L. Ivanov. Antarctica: Livingston Island and Smith Island. Scale 1:100000 topographic map. Manfred Wörner Foundation, 2017. ISBN 978-619-90008-3-0
- Antarctic Digital Database (ADD). Scale 1:250000 topographic map of Antarctica. Scientific Committee on Antarctic Research (SCAR). Since 1993, regularly upgraded and updated
