= Fletcher Nunatak =

Antarctic nunatak

Location of Livingston Island in the South Shetland Islands

Fletcher Nunatak (Bulgarian: нунатак Флечър, romanized: nunatak Fletcher, IPA: ['nunɐtak 'flɛt͡ʃər]) is the hill rising to 150 m at the base of the small peninsula ending in Avitohol Point on the north coast of Livingston Island in the South Shetland Islands, Antarctica. It has a partly ice-free area of 0.54 ha extending 100 m in southwest–northeast direction and 60 m in southeast–northwest direction. The nunatak surmounts Hero Bay on the northeast, and is part of the glacial divide between Tundzha Glacier on the southeast and Berkovitsa Glacier on the west. The area was visited by early 19th century sealers.

The feature is named after the American woman land surveyor Alice Cunningham Fletcher (1838–1923), in association with other names in the area deriving from the early development or use of geodetic instruments and methods.

== Location ==
Fletcher Nunatak is centered at 62°34′29″S 60°38′17″W, which is 1.34 km northeast of Snow Peak and 1.64 km south-southwest of Avitohol Point.

== Maps ==
Topographic map of Livingston Island and Smith Island

- Livingston Island to King George Island. Scale 1:200000. Admiralty Nautical Chart 1776. Taunton: UK Hydrographic Office, 1968
- South Shetland Islands. Scale 1:200000 topographic map No. 3373. DOS 610 - W 62 58. Tolworth, UK, 1968
- L. Ivanov. Antarctica: Livingston Island and Greenwich, Robert, Snow and Smith Islands. Scale 1:120000 topographic map. Troyan: Manfred Wörner Foundation, 2010. ISBN 978-954-92032-9-5 (First edition 2009. ISBN 978-954-92032-6-4)
- L. Ivanov. Antarctica: Livingston Island and Smith Island. Scale 1:100000 topographic map. Manfred Wörner Foundation, 2017. ISBN 978-619-90008-3-0
- Antarctic Digital Database (ADD). Scale 1:250000 topographic map of Antarctica. Scientific Committee on Antarctic Research (SCAR). Since 1993, regularly upgraded and updated
