= Lukovit Point =

Coordinates: 62°34′00″S 60°28′00″W

Location of Livingston Island in the South Shetland Islands.

Topographic map of Livingston Island

Lukovit Point (Bulgarian: нос Луковит, ‘Nos Lukovit’ \'nos 'lu-ko-vit\) is an ice-free point on the coast of Hero Bay, Livingston Island in the South Shetland Islands, Antarctica forming the west side of the entrance to Maleshevo Cove. Situated 2.74 km west-southwest of Siddins Point, 3.27 km east by north of Atanasova Point and 5.6 km east of Kuklen Point. Shape enhanced as a result of the retreat of Tundzha Glacier in the late 20th and early 21st centuries. Spanish mapping in 1991, Bulgarian in 2005 and 2009. Named after the town of Lukovit in northern Bulgaria.

== Maps ==
- L.L. Ivanov et al., Antarctica: Livingston Island and Greenwich Island, South Shetland Islands (from English Strait to Morton Strait, with illustrations and ice-cover distribution), Scale 1: 100000 map, Antarctic Place-names Commission of Bulgaria, Ministry of Foreign Affairs, Sofia, 2005
- L.L. Ivanov. Antarctica: Livingston Island and Greenwich, Robert, Snow and Smith Islands. Scale 1:120000 topographic map. Troyan: Manfred Wörner Foundation, 2009. ISBN 978-954-92032-6-4
- Antarctic Digital Database (ADD). Scale 1:250000 topographic map of Antarctica. Scientific Committee on Antarctic Research (SCAR). Since 1993, regularly upgraded and updated.
- L.L. Ivanov. Antarctica: Livingston Island and Smith Island. Scale 1:100000 topographic map. Manfred Wörner Foundation, 2017. ISBN 978-619-90008-3-0
