= Kamchiya Glacier =

Glacier in Antarctica

- Location of Livingston Island in the South Shetland Islands

- Location within South Shetland Islands Location within Antarctica
- Location: Livingston Island; South Shetland Islands
- Coordinates: 62°37′22″S 60°31′00″W
- Thickness: unknown
- Terminus: South Bay
- Status: unknown

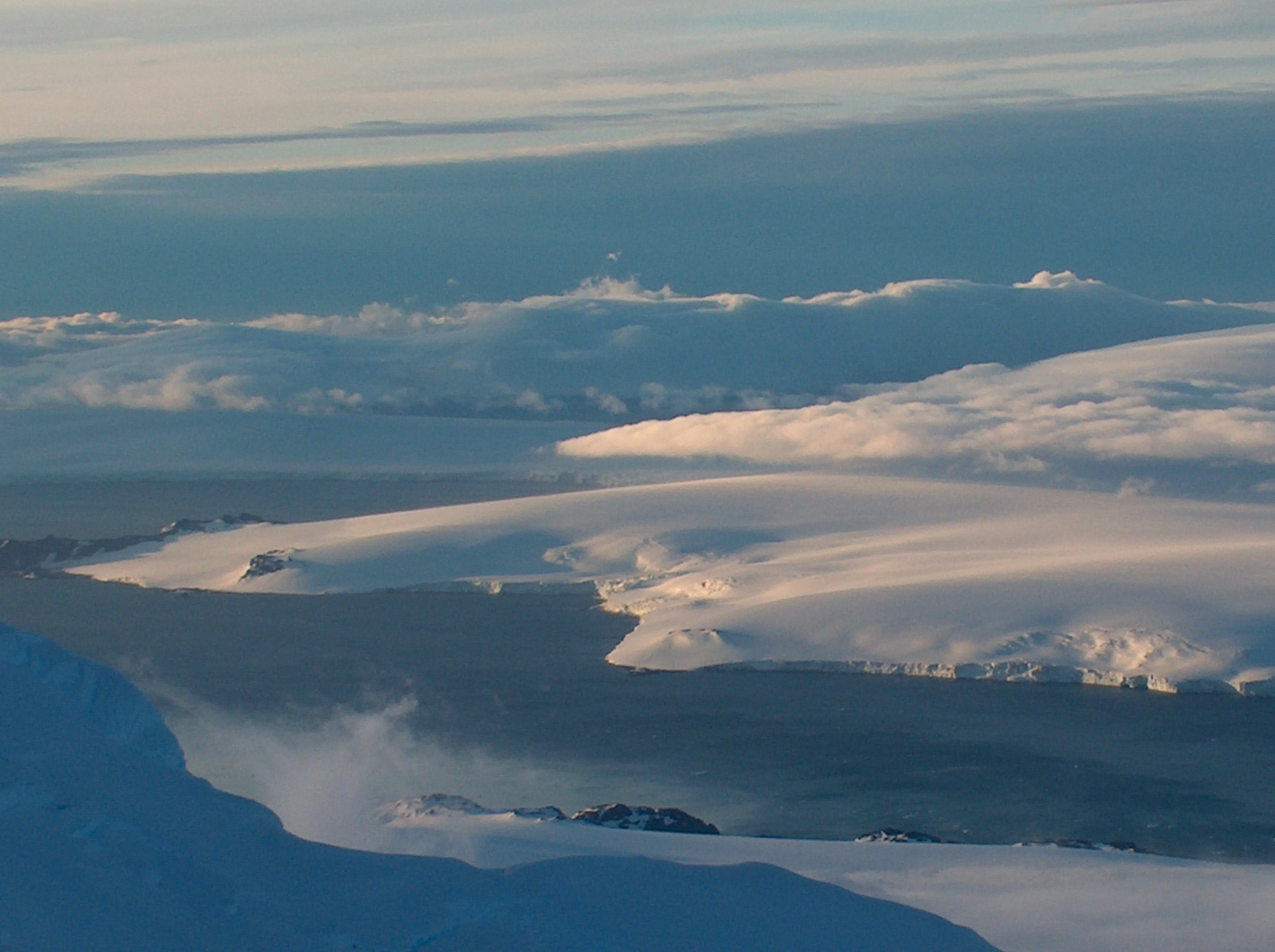
Kamchiya Glacier from Lyaskovets Peak

Topographic map of Livingston Island and Smith Island

Kamchiya Glacier (Bulgarian: ледник Камчия, romanized: lednik Kamchiya, IPA: [ˈlɛdnik ˈkamt͡ʃijɐ]) is located on Livingston Island in the South Shetland Islands, Antarctica situated south of the glacial divide between the Drake Passage and Bransfield Strait, and south of Tundzha Glacier, west-southwest of Pimpirev Glacier and east of Verila Glacier. The glacier extends 5 km along an east–west axis and is 2.2 km wide, draining into South Bay between Ereby Point and Memorable Beach.

The feature is named after the Kamchiya River in northeastern Bulgaria.

== Location ==
Kamchiya Glacier is centred at 62°37′22″S 60°31′00″W. Bulgarian mapping in 2005, 2009 and 2017.

== See also ==
- List of glaciers in the Antarctic
- Glaciology

== Maps ==
- L.L. Ivanov et al. Antarctica: Livingston Island and Greenwich Island, South Shetland Islands. Scale 1:100000 topographic map. Sofia: Antarctic Place-names Commission of Bulgaria, 2005.
- L.L. Ivanov. Antarctica: Livingston Island and Greenwich, Robert, Snow and Smith Islands. Scale 1:120000 topographic map. Troyan: Manfred Wörner Foundation, 2009.
- L.L. Ivanov. Antarctica: Livingston Island and Smith Island. Scale 1:100000 topographic map. Manfred Wörner Foundation, 2017. ISBN 978-619-90008-3-0
