= Rongel Point =

Point on Livingston Island, Antarctica

Location of Livingston Island in the South Shetland Islands

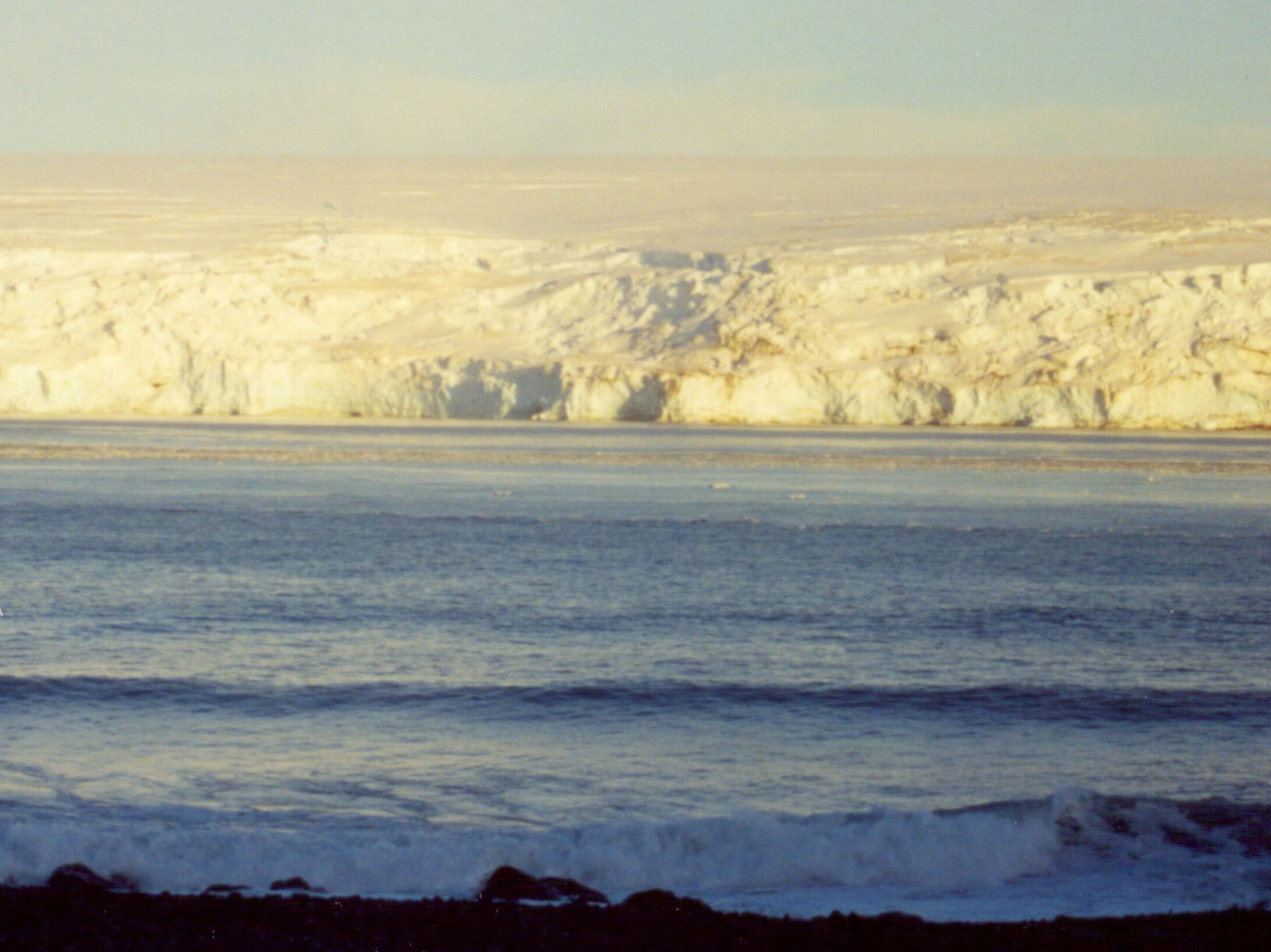
Rongel Point from Bulgarian Beach

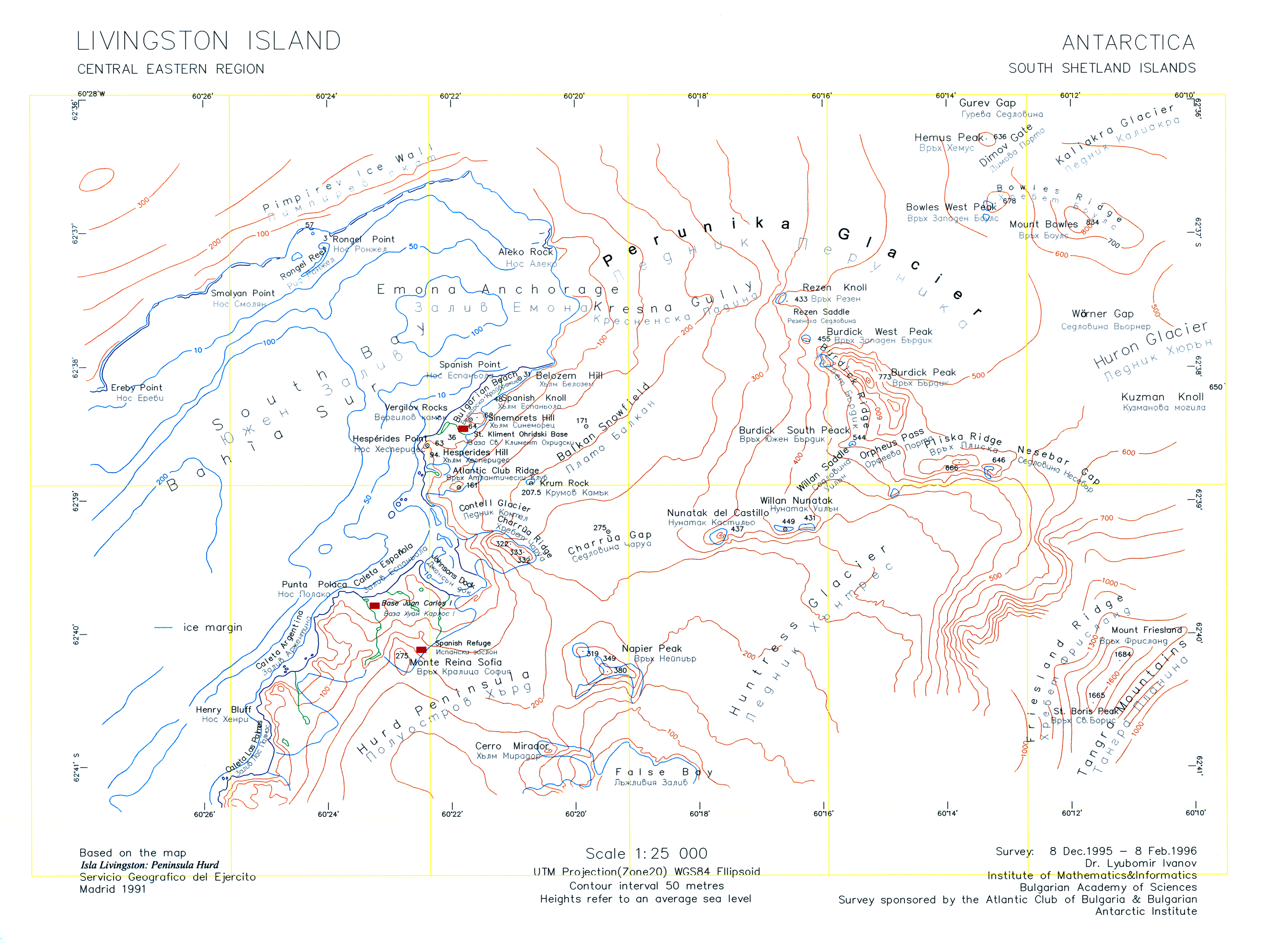
1996 topographic map of the area featuring Rongel Point

Rongel Point (Nos Rongel \'nos ron-'zhel\) is an ice-covered headland on the northwest coast of South Bay, Livingston Island in the South Shetland Islands, Antarctica. The area was visited by 19th century sealers operating from nearby Johnsons Dock.

The feature takes its name from nearby Rongel Reef named after the Brazilian Navy research vessel Ary Rongel, in recognition of her logistic support for the Bulgarian Antarctic campaigns.

== Location ==
Ary Rongel Point is located at 62°37′00″S 60°24′48″W, which is 1.3 km northeast of Smolyan Point, 4 km west of Aleko Point and 3.5 km northwest of Hespérides Point. Bulgarian mapping from a topographic survey of the region made from 8 December 1995 to 8 February 1996; the coastal configuration in the area was altered subsequently as a result of Pimpirev Glacier's retreat in the late 20th and early 21st centuries.

== Maps ==
- Isla Livingston: Península Hurd. Mapa topográfico de escala 1:25000. Madrid: Servicio Geográfico del Ejército, 1991. (Map reproduced on p. 16 of the linked work)
- L.L. Ivanov. Livingston Island: Central-Eastern Region. Scale 1:25000 topographic map. Sofia: Antarctic Place-names Commission of Bulgaria, 1996
- L.L. Ivanov et al. Antarctica: Livingston Island and Greenwich Island, South Shetland Islands. Scale 1:100000 topographic map. Sofia: Antarctic Place-names Commission of Bulgaria, 2005
- L.L. Ivanov. Antarctica: Livingston Island and Greenwich, Robert, Snow and Smith Islands. Scale 1:120000 topographic map. Troyan: Manfred Wörner Foundation, 2009. ISBN 978-954-92032-6-4
