= Smolyan Point =

Geographic point on the north-western coast of South Bay, Livingston Island

Location of Livingston Island in the South Shetland Islands.

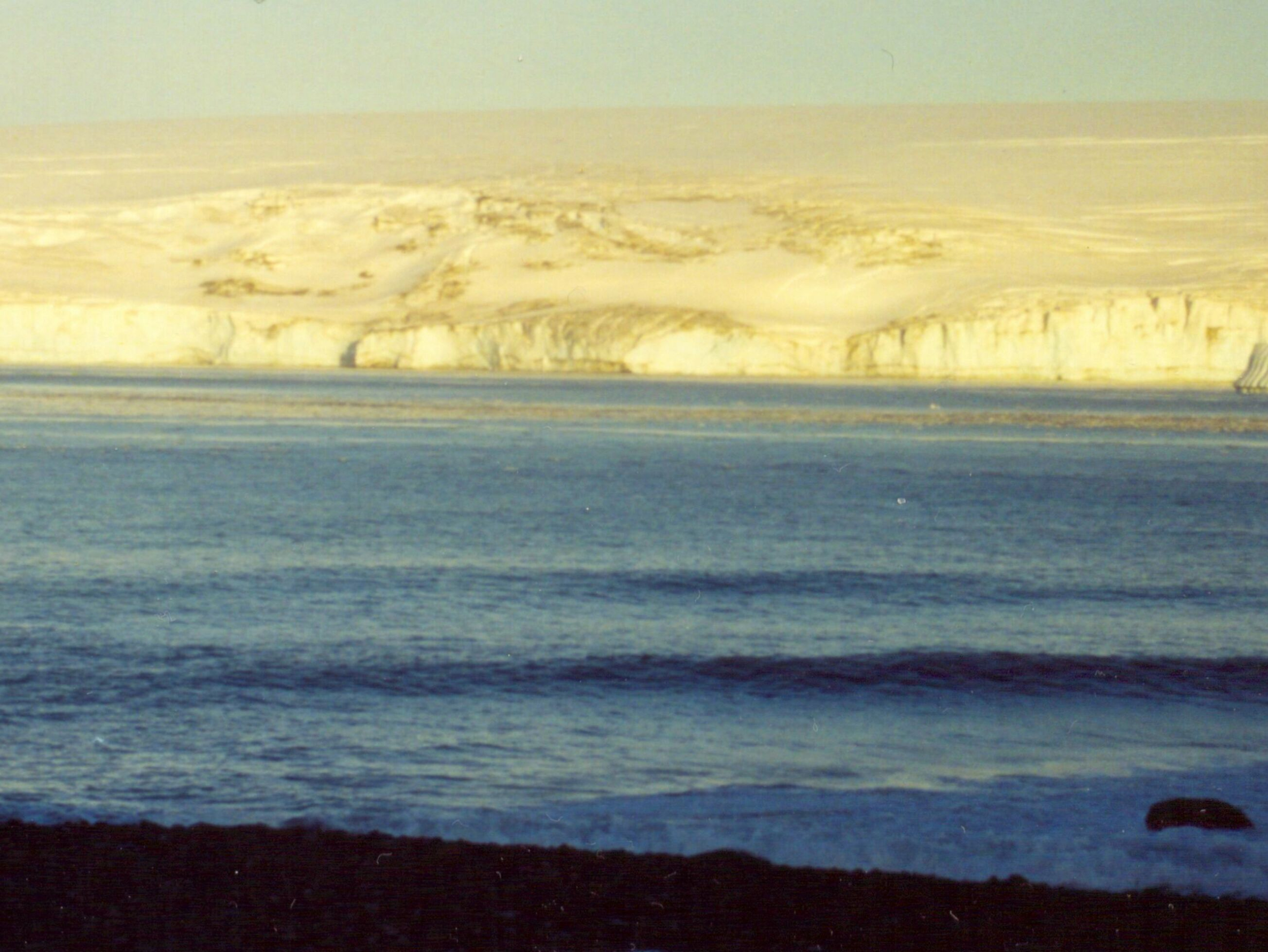
Smolyan Point from Bulgarian Beach, with Emona Anchorage in the foreground and Pimpirev Glacier in the background.

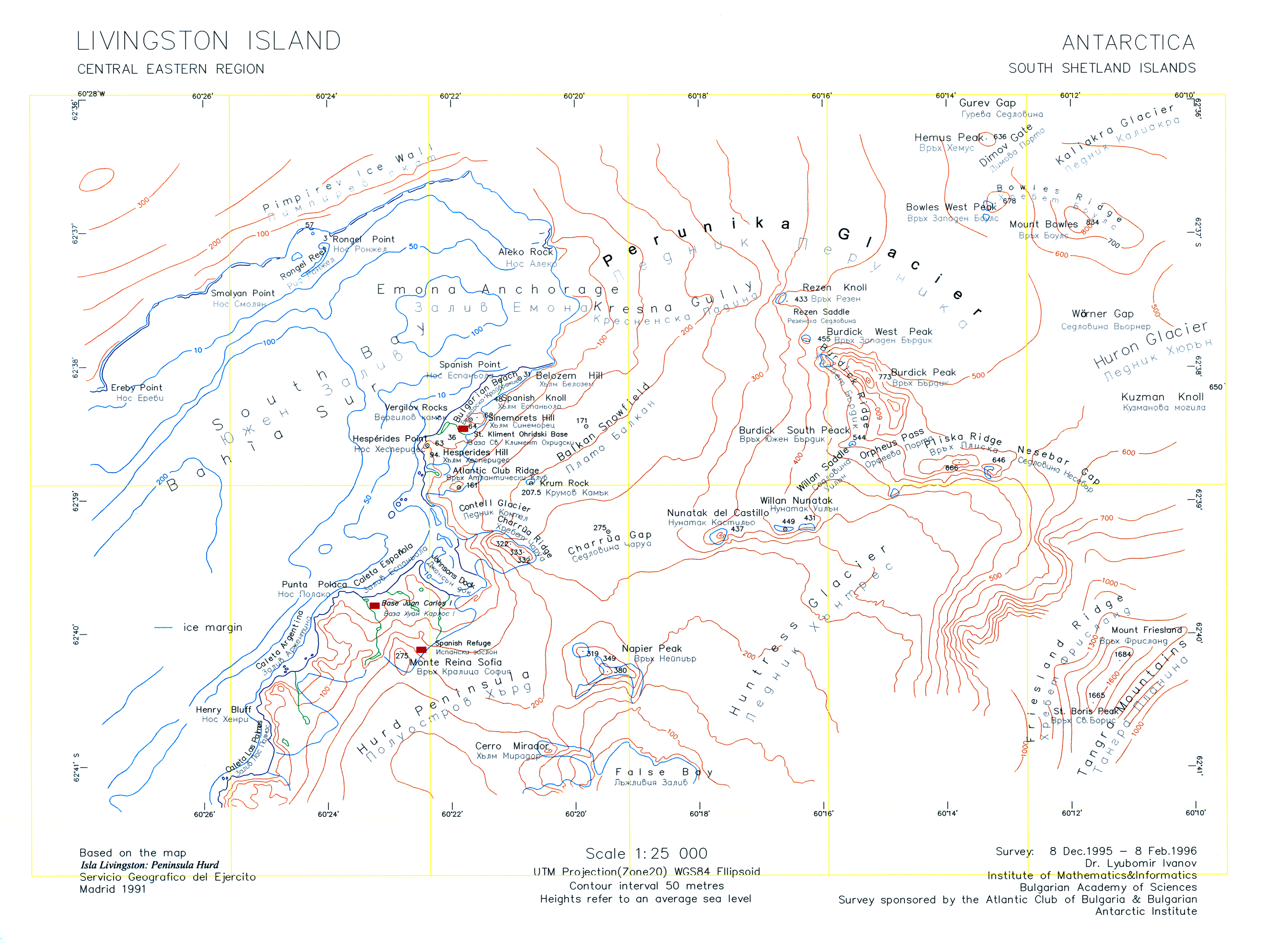
Topographic map of central-eastern Livingston Island featuring Smolyan Point.

Topographic map of Livingston Island, Greenwich, Robert, Snow and Smith Islands.

Smolyan Point (Nos Smolyan \'nos 'smo-lyan\) is located on the north-western coast of South Bay, Livingston Island in the South Shetland Islands, Antarctica forming the northwest side of the entrance to Emona Anchorage. The ice-covered point shows conspicuous radial crevasses spreading inland and ends up with a 25 m wide and 4 m high rock. The feature was formed as a result of Pimpirev Glacier's retreat in the late 20th century.

Smolyan is the name of a town in the Rhodope Mountains in southern Bulgaria.

== Location ==
The point is located at 62°37′27.7″S 60°25′57″W, which is 1.86 km east-northeast of Ereby Point and 3.7 km northwest of Hespérides Point. (Bulgarian mapping in 1996, 2005 and 2009 from a 1995/96 Bulgarian topographic survey).

== Maps ==
- L.L. Ivanov. Livingston Island: Central-Eastern Region. Scale 1:25000 topographic map. Sofia: Antarctic Place-names Commission of Bulgaria, 1996.
- L.L. Ivanov et al. Antarctica: Livingston Island and Greenwich Island, South Shetland Islands. Scale 1:100000 topographic map. Sofia: Antarctic Place-names Commission of Bulgaria, 2005.
- L.L. Ivanov. Antarctica: Livingston Island and Greenwich, Robert, Snow and Smith Islands. Scale 1:120000 topographic map. Troyan: Manfred Wörner Foundation, 2009. ISBN 978-954-92032-6-4
