= Pimpirev Glacier =

Glacier on Livingston Island, South Shetland Islands, Antarctica

- Location of Livingston Island in the South Shetland Islands

- Location within South Shetland Islands Location within Antarctica
- Location: Livingston Island; South Shetland Islands
- Coordinates: 62°36′25″S 60°25′00″W
- Length: 3 nautical miles (5.6 km; 3.5 mi)
- Width: 1 nautical mile (1.9 km; 1.2 mi)
- Thickness: unknown
- Terminus: South Bay
- Status: unknown

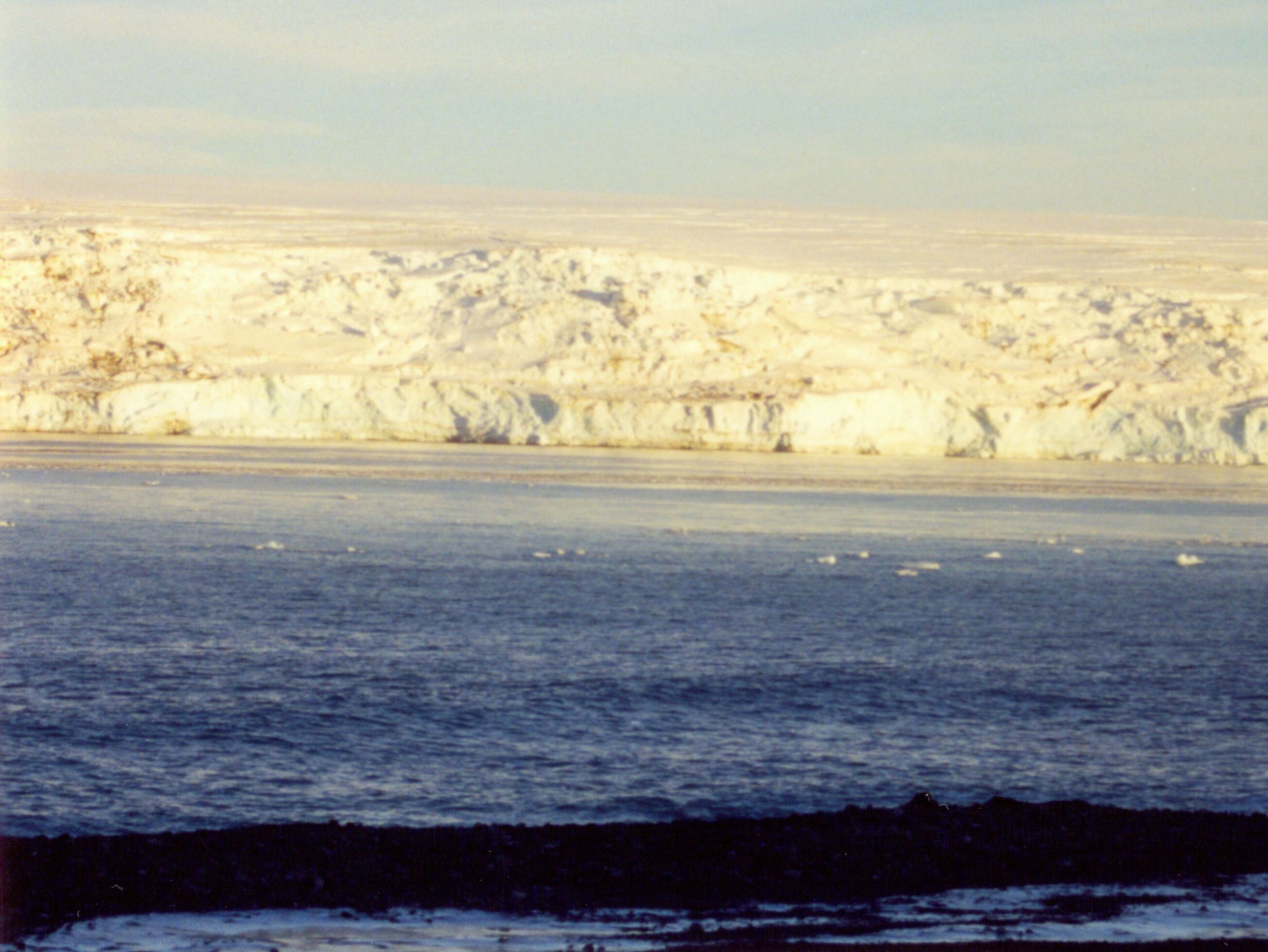
Pimpirev Glacier from Bulgarian Beach, with Emona Anchorage in the foreground

Topographic map of Livingston Island and Smith Island

Pimpirev Glacier (Bulgarian: Пимпирев ледник, romanized: Pimpirev lednik, IPA: [pimˈpirɛf ˈlɛdnik]) on Livingston Island in the South Shetland Islands, Antarctica is situated south of the glacial divide between the Drake Passage and Bransfield Strait, southeast of Tundzha Glacier, southwest of Saedinenie Snowfield, west of Perunika Glacier and east-northeast of Kamchiya Glacier. The feature extends 5.5 km in a southeast-northwest direction, and 1.8 km in northwest-southeast direction. The glacier drains southeastwards towards Pimpirev Beach, mostly terminating on the shore, and on several occasions penetrating the South Bay waters east-northeast of Ereby Point.

== Name origin ==
The feature is named for Christo Pimpirev, geologist in the First Bulgarian Antarctic Expedition in 1987/88 and leader of subsequent national Antarctic campaigns. The original name Pimpirev Ice Wall was given on October 29, 1996 to the 50-m high rectilinear ice scarp-slope running parallelly to and some 100 m inland from the coast of South Bay northeast of Ereby Point. Reflecting subsequent changes in the ice cap configuration, the present name form was approved for the relevant glacier on November 4, 2005.

== Location ==
Pimpirev Glacier is located at 62°36′25″S 60°25′00″W (Mapped by the Spanish Servicio Geográfico del Ejército in 1991, Bulgarian topographic survey in 1995/96 and mapping in 1996, 2005 and 2009).

== See also ==
- List of glaciers in the Antarctic
- Glaciology

== Maps ==
- L.L. Ivanov. Livingston Island: Central-Eastern Region. Scale 1:25000 topographic map. Sofia: Antarctic Place-names Commission of Bulgaria, 1996.
- L.L. Ivanov et al. Antarctica: Livingston Island and Greenwich Island, South Shetland Islands. Scale 1:100000 topographic map. Sofia: Antarctic Place-names Commission of Bulgaria, 2005.
- L.L. Ivanov. Antarctica: Livingston Island and Greenwich, Robert, Snow and Smith Islands. Scale 1:120000 topographic map. Troyan: Manfred Wörner Foundation, 2009. ISBN 978-954-92032-6-4
