= Maleshevo Mountain =

Mountain ranging from North Macedonia to Bulgaria

Coordinates: 41°40′N 23°00′E

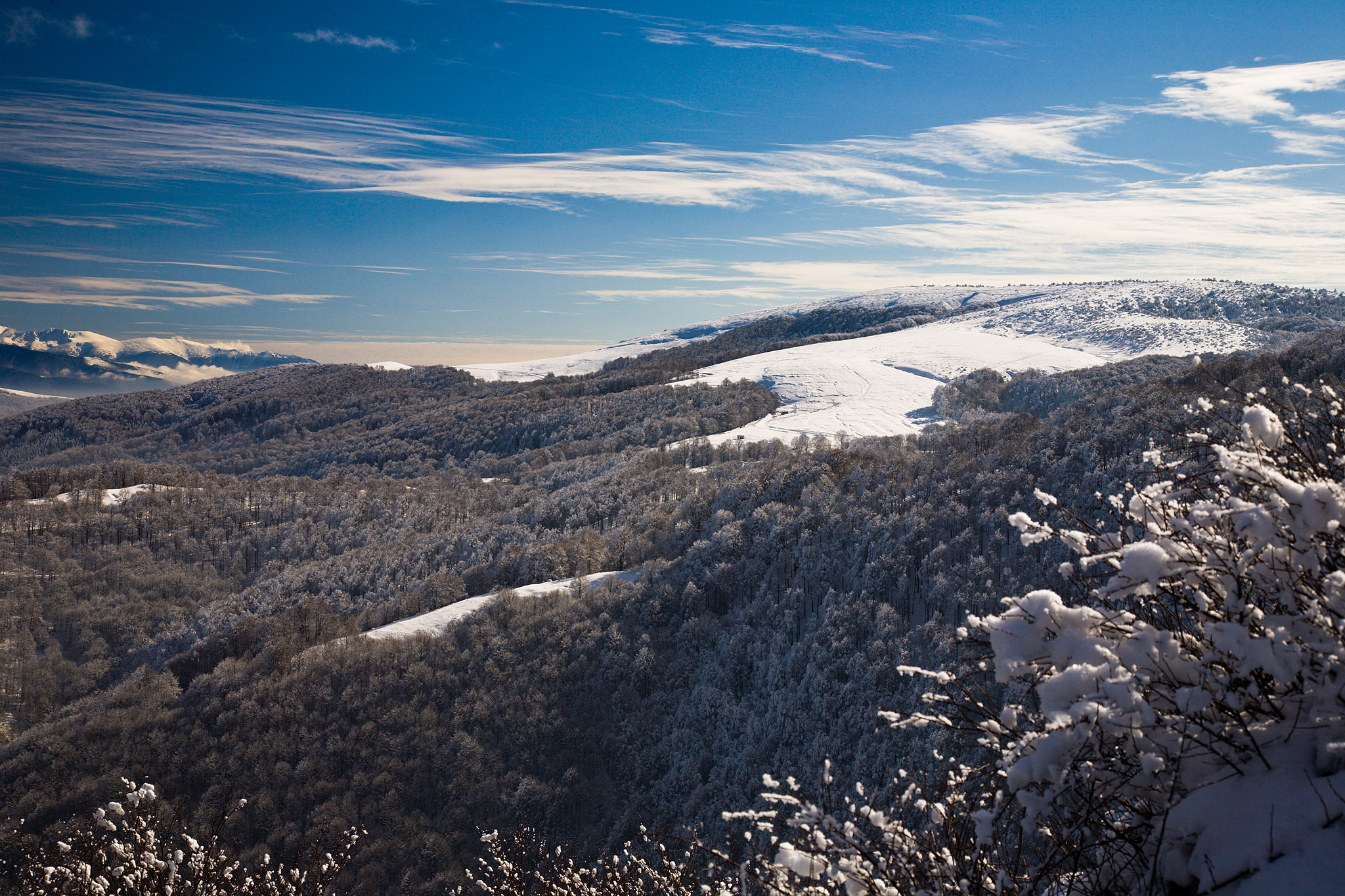
Ilyov Vrah

The Maleshevo Mountain (Bulgarian: Малешевска планина, romanized: Maleshevska planina) or Maleševo Mountain (Macedonian: Малешевски Планини, romanized: Maleševski Planini), is situated in southwestern Bulgaria and eastern North Macedonia. It is the third of the five mountains of the Osogovo-Belasica mountain group, known also as the Western Border Mountains. The highest point is Ilyov Vrah (1,803 m).

The mountain represents an elongated structure with area of 497 km^{2}. It has rich wildlife which includes many Mediterranean flora and fauna species. There are two nature reserves to protect the varied wildlife.

Maleshevo Cove on the north coast of Livingston Island in the South Shetland Islands, Antarctica, is named after "the Maleshevo region in Southwestern Bulgaria."

== See also ==
- Maleševci
