= Maleshevo Cove =

Antarctic cove

Location of Livingston Island in the South Shetland Islands.

Topographic map of Livingston Island and Smith Island.

Maleshevo Cove (Bulgarian: залив Малешево, romanized: zaliv Maleshevo, IPA: [ˈzalif mɐˈlɛʃɛvo]) is a 2.5 km wide cove indenting for 1.1 km the north coast of Livingston Island in the South Shetland Islands, Antarctica. It is entered between Lukovit Point and Siddins Point.

The cove is named after the Maleshevo region in southwestern Bulgaria.

== Location ==
Maleshevo Cove is located at 62°33′36″S 60°26′36″W. A Spanish mapping was done in 1991 and Bulgarian ones in 2005 and 2009.

== Map ==
- L.L. Ivanov. Antarctica: Livingston Island and Greenwich, Robert, Snow and Smith Islands. Scale 1:120000 topographic map. Troyan: Manfred Wörner Foundation, 2009. ISBN 978-954-92032-6-4
