= Snow Peak (Antarctica) =

Location of Livingston Island in the South Shetland Islands.

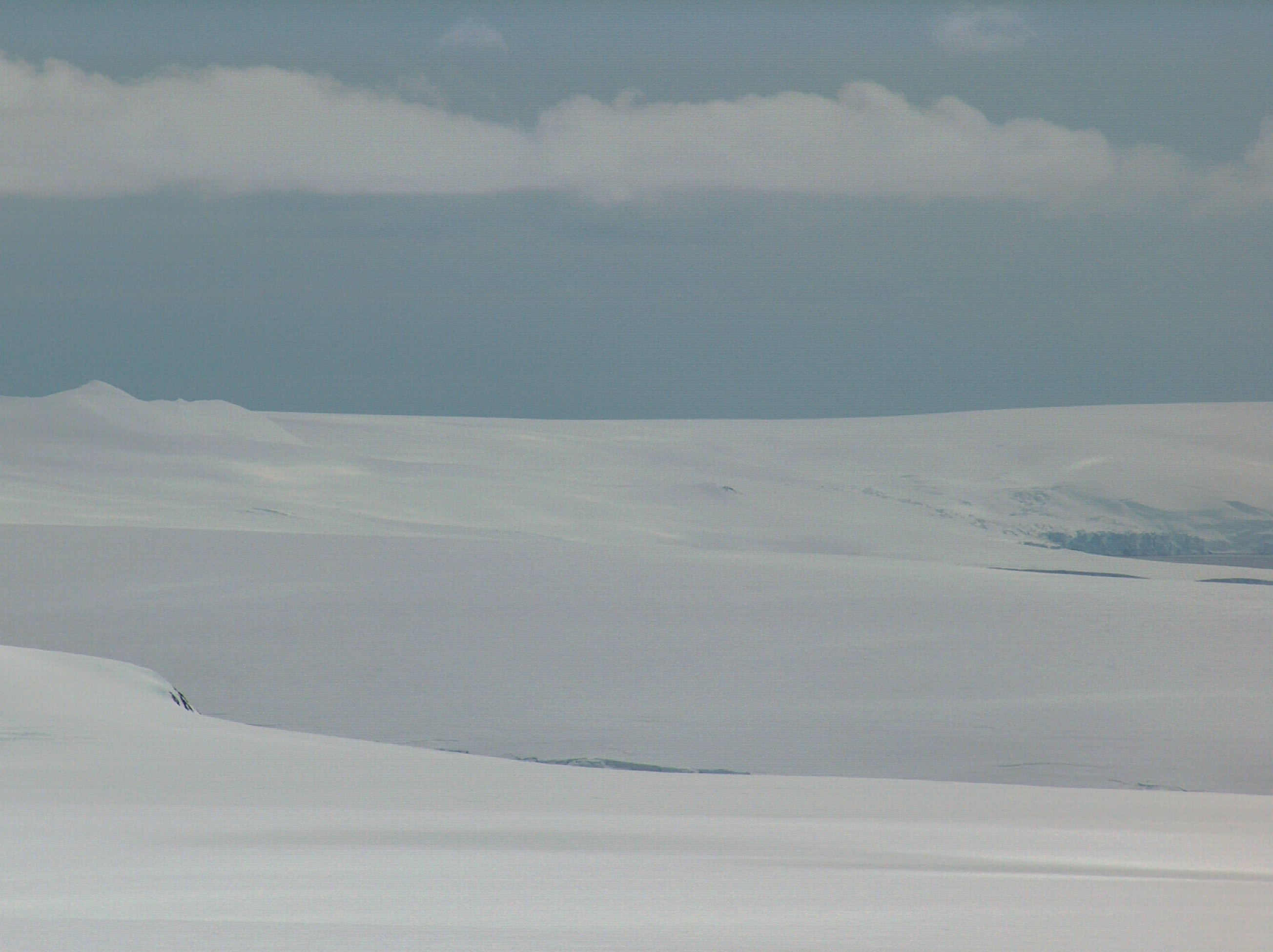
Snow Peak (in the left background) from Kuzman Knoll.

Topographic map of Livingston Island, Greenwich, Robert, Snow and Smith Islands.

Snow Peak is a snow-covered peak rising to 428 m in western Livingston Island in the South Shetland Islands, Antarctica. It is linked by a saddle to Casanovas Peak in the west, and surmounts Berkovitsa Glacier to the northwest, Fletcher Nunatak and Belev Nunatak to the northeast, Tundzha Glacier to the east and Verila Glacier to the southwest.

The feature was charted and named descriptively by Discovery Investigations personnel in 1935.

== Location ==
The peak is located at 62°34′59″S 60°42′43″W which is 12.89 km northeast of Rotch Dome, 2.83 km east of Casanovas Peak, 2.92 km southwest of Avitohol Point and 7.04 km north-northwest of Ustra Peak (British mapping in 1935 and 1968, and Bulgarian in 2005 and 2009).

== Maps ==
- L.L. Ivanov et al. Antarctica: Livingston Island and Greenwich Island, South Shetland Islands. Scale 1:100000 topographic map. Sofia: Antarctic Place-names Commission of Bulgaria, 2005.
- L.L. Ivanov. Antarctica: Livingston Island and Greenwich, Robert, Snow and Smith Islands. Scale 1:120000 topographic map. Troyan: Manfred Wörner Foundation, 2009. ISBN 978-954-92032-6-4
