= Rongel Reef =

Reef in South Shetlands Islands, Antarctica

- Location on Antarctic Peninsula Location in Antarctica

Geography
- Location: Antarctica
- Coordinates: 62°37′16″S 60°24′11″W
- Archipelago: South Shetland Islands
- Length: 0.6 km (0.37 mi)

Administration
- Antarctica
- Administered under the Antarctic Treaty System

Demographics
- Population: uninhabited

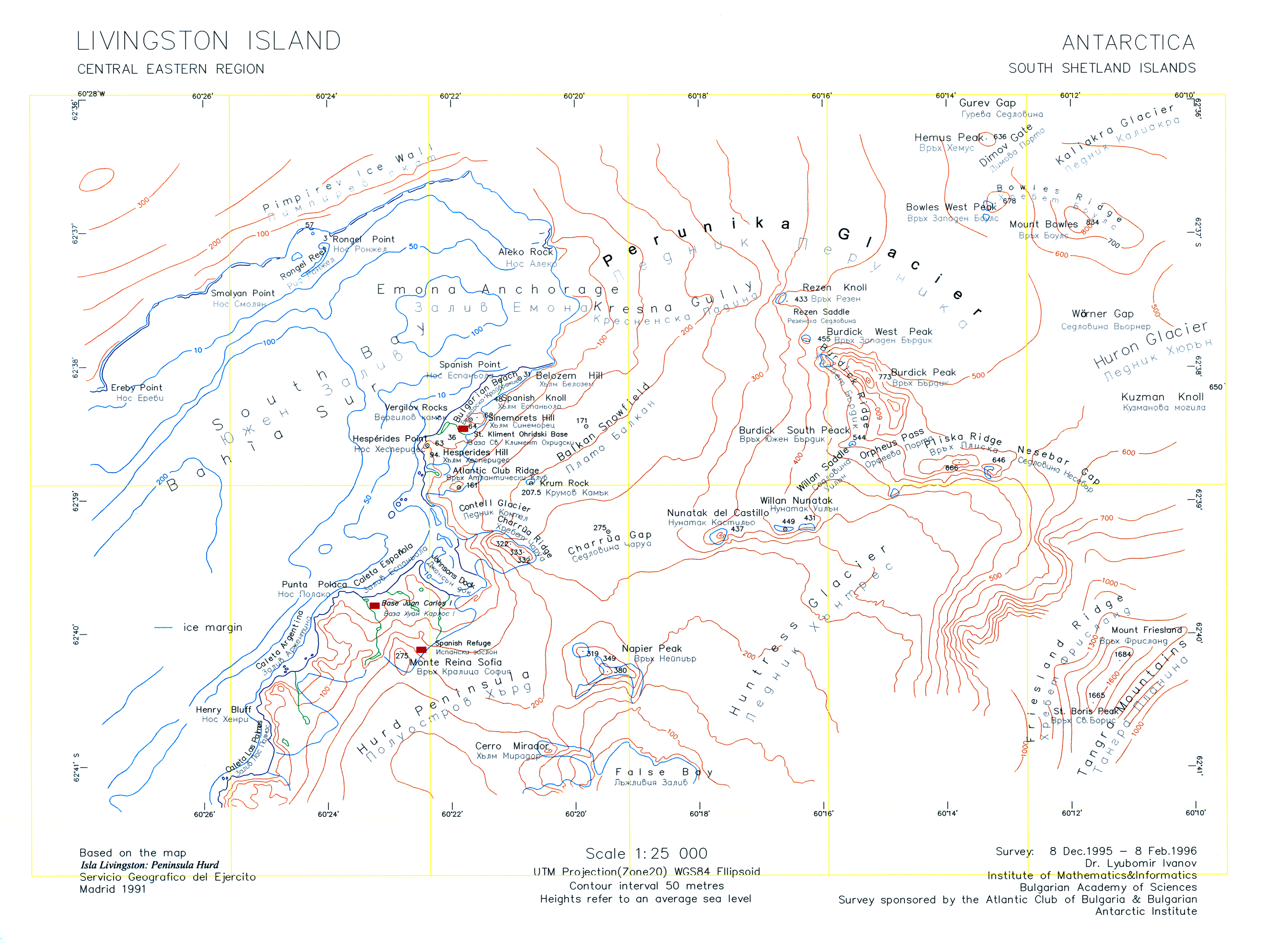
Topographic map of central-eastern Livingston Island featuring Rongel Reef.

Rongel Reef (Bulgarian: Rif Rongel 'rif ron-'zhel), is a moraine reef in the Emona Anchorage in the eastern parts of Livingston Island in the South Shetland Islands, Antarctica. The reef emerged during a glacier retreat in the late 20th and early 21st centuries.

The reef extends over 600 m (656 yd) in northeast–southwest direction and is partly exposed at low tide and submerged at high tide but for the islet rising to near 3 m (9.8 ft) at its northeast extremity.

Its midpoint is located 2.85 km (1.77 mi) north-northwest of Hespérides Point, 3.12 km (1.94 mi) west of Aleko Point, and 3.35 km (2.08 mi) northeast by east of Ereby Point. The northeast extremity of Rongel Reef is located 75 m (82 yd) south-southwest of Rongel Point. A 710 m (776 yd) wide nameless cove is indenting for 250 m (273 yd) the coast behind Rongel Reef, the northeast side of its entrance formed by Rongel Point. The southwest extremity of Rongel Reef is located 300 m (328 yd) southeast of the nameless point located 3.18 km (1.98 mi) northwest by north of Hespérides Point and 3.04 km (1.89 mi) northeast by east of Ereby Point.

The feature is named after the Brazilian Navy ship Ary Rongel, in recognition of her logistic support for the Bulgarian Antarctic programme.

== Location ==
The reef is centered at 62°37′16″S 60°24′11″W (Bulgarian mapping from a topographic survey of the region made from 8 December 1995 to 8 February 1996).

== See also ==
- Composite Antarctic Gazetteer
- List of Antarctic islands south of 60° S
- SCAR
- Territorial claims in Antarctica

== Maps ==
- L.L. Ivanov. Livingston Island: Central-Eastern Region. Scale 1:25000 topographic map. Sofia: Antarctic Place-names Commission of Bulgaria, 1996.
- L.L. Ivanov et al. Antarctica: Livingston Island and Greenwich Island, South Shetland Islands. Scale 1:100000 topographic map. Sofia: Antarctic Place-names Commission of Bulgaria, 2005.
- L.L. Ivanov. Antarctica: Livingston Island and Greenwich, Robert, Snow and Smith Islands. Scale 1:120000 topographic map. Troyan: Manfred Wörner Foundation, 2009. ISBN 978-954-92032-6-4
