= Skravena Cove =

Location of Livingston Island in the South Shetland Islands.

Topographic map of Livingston Island, Greenwich, Robert, Snow and Smith Islands.

Skravena Cove (Bulgarian: залив Скравена, romanized: zaliv Skravena, IPA: [ˈzalif skrɐˈvɛnɐ]) is a 2.1 km wide cove indenting for 1 km the north coast of Livingston Island in the South Shetland Islands, Antarctica. Entered between Avitohol Point and Kuklen Point.

The cove is named after the settlement of Skravena in northern Bulgaria.

== Location ==
Skravena Cove is centred at 62°34′22″S 60°35′50″W. Spanish mapping in 1991 and Bulgarian in 2005, 2009 and 2010.

== Maps ==
- L.L. Ivanov et al. Antarctica: Livingston Island and Greenwich Island, South Shetland Islands. Scale 1:100000 topographic map. Sofia: Antarctic Place-names Commission of Bulgaria, 2005.
- L.L. Ivanov. Antarctica: Livingston Island and Greenwich, Robert, Snow and Smith Islands. Scale 1:120000 topographic map. Troyan: Manfred Wörner Foundation, 2009. ISBN 978-954-92032-6-4
