= Alice Cunningham Fletcher =

American ethnologist, anthropologist, social scientist

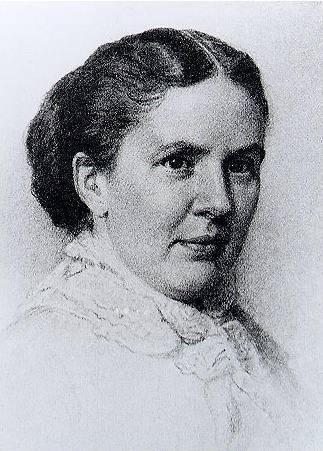
- Fletcher, c. 1893
- Born: March 15, 1838; Havana, Cuba
- Died: April 6, 1923 (aged 85); Washington, D.C.
- Scientific career
- Fields: Ethnology
- Workplaces: Peabody Museum of Archaeology and Ethnology; Anthropological Society of Washington; American Folklore Society; School of American Archaeology

Alice Cunningham Fletcher (March 15, 1838 – April 6, 1923) was an American ethnologist, anthropologist, and social scientist who studied and documented Native American culture. Fletcher was a proponent of Native American cultural assimilation, the Indian boarding school system, and private landownership among indigenous peoples.

== Early life and education ==
Not much is known about Fletcher's parents; her father was a New York lawyer and her mother was from a prominent Boston family. Her parents moved to Havana, Cuba in vain hopes of easing her father's illness with a better climate. Fletcher was born there in 1838. After her father died in 1839, the family moved to Brooklyn Heights, New York City. Fletcher was enrolled in the Brooklyn Female Academy, an exclusive school for the elite.

== Career ==
Fletcher taught school and later became a public lecturer to support herself, arguing that anthropologists and archaeologists were best at uncovering ancient history of humans. She also advocated for the education of Native Americans "so that they could gain accoutrements of civilization."

Fletcher credited Frederic Ward Putnam for stimulating her interest in American Indian culture and began working with him at the Peabody Museum of Archaeology and Ethnology, Harvard University. She studied the remnants of the Indian civilization in the Ohio and Mississippi valleys, and became a member of the Archaeological Institute of America in 1879.

From 1881, Fletcher was involved with the Carlisle Indian School in Pennsylvania, where native children learned English, arithmetic, and skills designed to allow them to be integrated American citizens.

In 1881, Fletcher made an unprecedented trip to live with and study the Sioux on their reservation as a representative of the Peabody Museum. She was accompanied by Susette "Bright Eyes" La Flesche, an Omaha spokeswoman who had served as interpreter for Standing Bear in 1879 in his landmark civil rights trial. Also with them was Thomas Tibbles, a journalist who had helped publicize Standing Bear's cause and arranged a several-month lecture tour in the United States.

These times also marked the beginning of Fletcher's 40-year association with Francis La Flesche, Susette's half brother. They collaborated professionally and had an informal mother-son relationship. They shared a house in Washington, D.C., beginning in 1890.

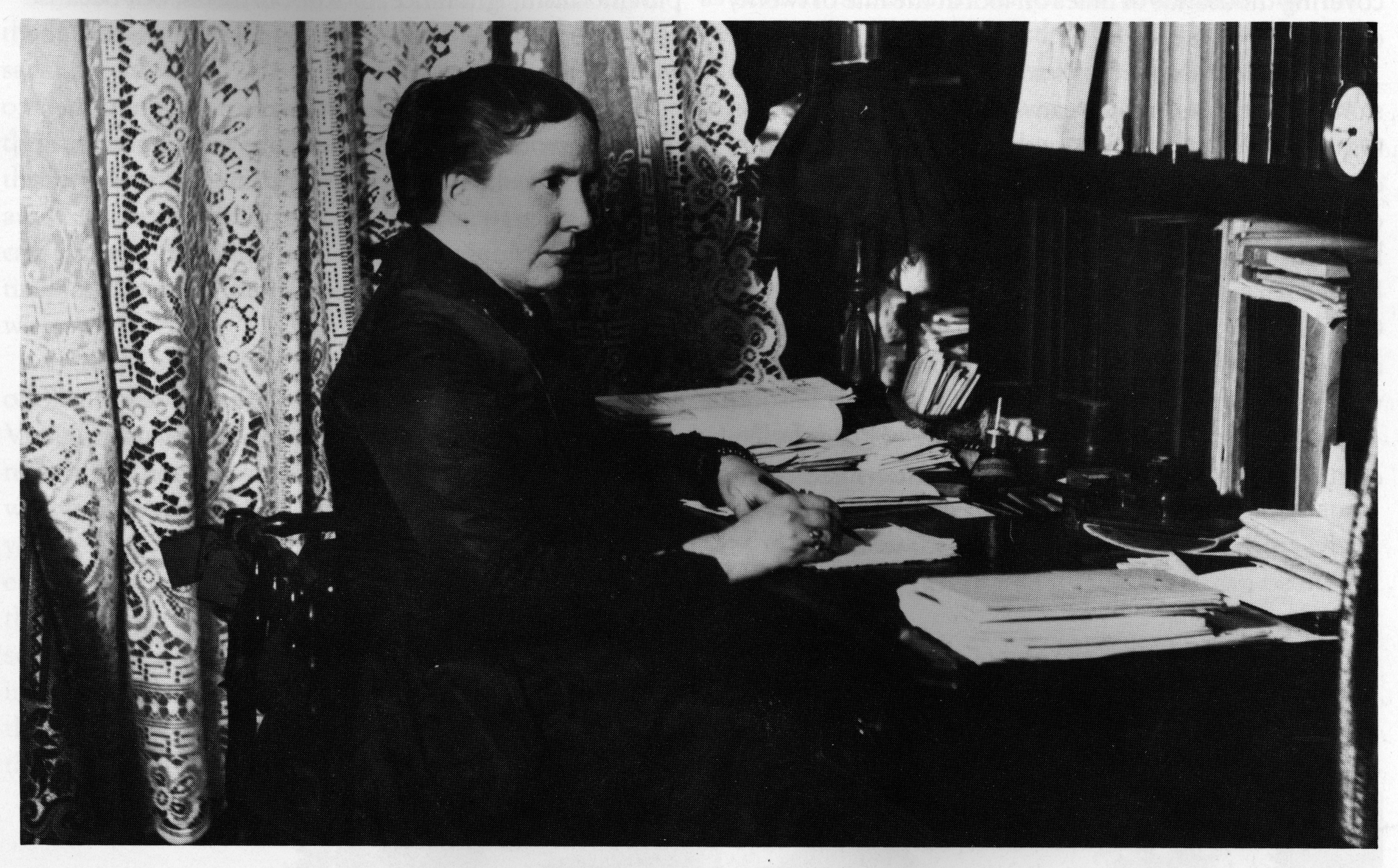
Alice Fletcher at her writing desk

In addition to her research and writing, Fletcher worked in several special appointed positions during the late nineteenth century. In 1883 she was appointed special agent by the US to allot lands to the Miwok tribes, in 1884 she prepared and sent to the World Cotton Centennial an exhibit showing the progress of civilization among the Indians of North America in the quarter-century previous, and in 1886 visited the natives of Alaska and the Aleutian Islands on a mission from the commissioner of education. In 1887 she was appointed United States special agent in the allotment of lands among the Winnebago and the Nez Perce under the Dawes Act.

She was made assistant in ethnology at the Peabody Museum in 1882, and in 1891 received the Thaw fellowship, which was created for her. Active in professional societies, she was elected president of the Anthropological Society of Washington and in 1905 as the first woman president of the American Folklore Society. She also served as vice-president of the American Association for the Advancement of Science, and was a longtime member of the Literary Society of Washington.

Working through the Women's National Indian Association, Fletcher introduced a system of making small loans to Indians, wherewith they might buy land and houses. She also helped secure a loan for Susan LaFlesche, an Omaha woman, to enable her studies at medical school. Graduating at the top of her class, LaFlesche became the first Native American woman doctor in the United States.

Later Fletcher helped write, lobbied for and helped administer the Dawes Act of 1887, which broke up reservations and distributed communal land in allotments for individual household ownership of land parcels.

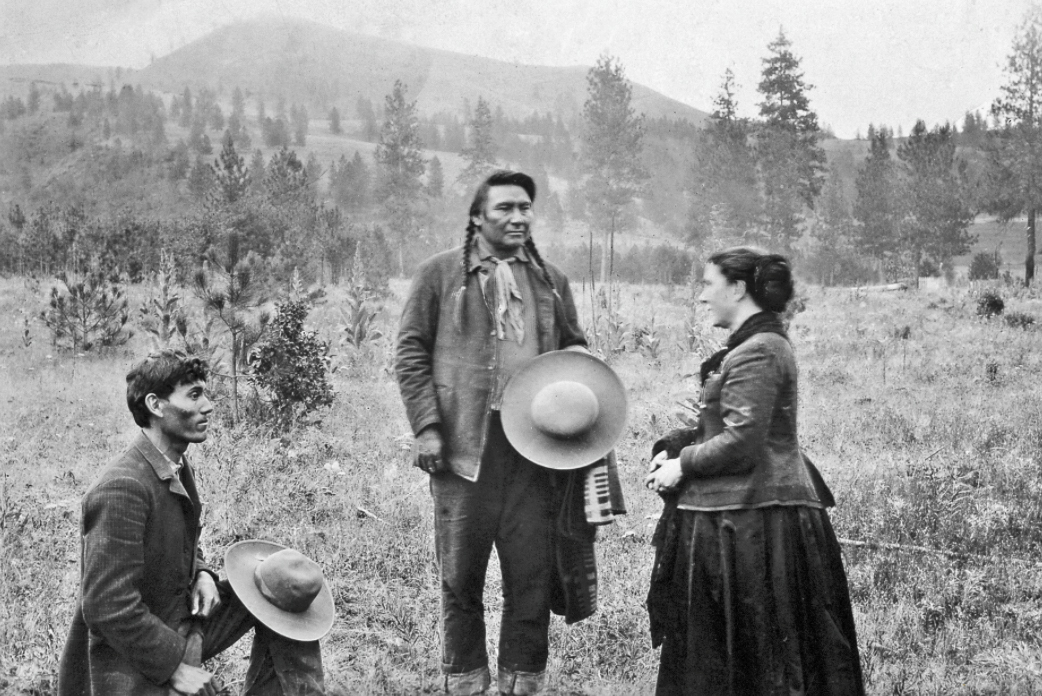
Fletcher and Chief Joseph at the Nez Percé Lapwai Reservation in Idaho Gentleman kneeling is an interpreter named James Stewart.

Hon'hewachi Song
A sample of North American Indian traditional music that was collected by Alice Fletcher

In 1888, Fletcher published Indian Education and Civilization, a special report of the Bureau of Education. She was a pioneer in the study of American Indian music, a field of research inaugurated by a paper she gave in 1893 before the Chicago Anthropological Conference. In 1898 at the Congress of Musicians held in Omaha during the Trans-Mississippi Exposition, she read several essays upon the songs of the North American Indians. A number of Omaha Indians sang their native melodies. Out of this grew her Indian Story and Song from North America (1900), exploring a stage of development antecedent to that in which culture music appeared.

Fletcher worked with Frederic Ward Putnam in his research on Serpents Mound in Ohio and assisted in the efforts to raise funds to purchase the site in 1886. The site was donated to the Ohio Archaeological and Historical Society in 1900 and is a National Historic Landmark.

In 1930, Margaret Mead started work with the Omaha, and decided to concentrate on the modern aspects of the tribe, because of the extensive work already done by Alice Fletcher.

Over her lifetime Alice Fletcher worked with and for the Omaha, Pawnee, Sioux, Arapaho, Cheyenne, Chippewa, Oto, Nez Percé, Ponca and Winnebago tribes.

=== Dawes Act ===
Alice Fletcher helped write and pass the Dawes Act of 1887. This act imposed a system of private land ownership on Indigenous tribes. This was a major change because traditionally these tribes had communal land ownership. Individual Indigenous peoples would be allotted up to 160 acres of land. This land was tax-free and was to be held in trust by the government for a period of 25 years. At the time, she thought it would enable American Indians to assimilate to European-American ways, as their best means of survival. The government also wanted to gain "surplus" land for sale to other Americans. The Dawes Act was accountable for the inevitable breakup of all Indigenous reservations. By 1932 the amount of land acquired was approximately 92,000,000 of the 138,000,000 acres Indigenous groups had owned in 1887. Fletcher's land allotment work has been viewed as an error in the administration policies of Native American peoples and their land. Fletcher herself may have even realized this error because she abandoned her political policy work to focus strictly on more ethnographical work after the turn of the century.

=== Fieldwork among the Sioux ===
Fletcher wrote about the experiences of her 1881 field trip in two journals. These journals included drawings of the plains, reservations, and many of her different campsites throughout eastern Nebraska and South Dakota. Even though many of her writings regarding the Sioux would seem rather insensible by contemporary anthropological standards, "Her writings reflect the attitudes regarding the movement of history and social evolution prevalent in her day".

=== Author ===
In 1911, with Francis La Flesche, she published The Omaha Tribe. It is still considered to be the definitive work on the subject. Altogether she wrote 46 monographs on ethnology. In 1908 she led in founding the School of American Archaeology in Santa Fe, New Mexico. From 1899 until 1916 Fletcher was on the editorial board of the American Anthropologist, and she also made major contributions to many issues. Fletcher was a pioneer in the study of Native American music. She became fascinated by their music and dancing so she transcribed hundreds of their songs. In 1898 she presented several essays on the subject of Native American songs at the Congress of Musicians in Omaha. From these essays eventually came her books Indian Story and Song from North America and The Hako: A Pawnee Ceremony.

== Death and legacy ==
Fletcher became president of the Anthropological Society of Washington in 1903 and the first woman president of the American Folklore Society in 1905. One of her colleagues, Walter Hough, remembered Fletcher as one who, "Mildly, peaceably, yet with great fortitude...did what she could to advance the cause of science". Her ashes are interred in the patio wall of the New Mexico Museum of Art behind a bronze plaque with a quote from her.

Some of her recordings can be found in the Smithsonian Institution Bureau of American Ethnology.

Arthur Farwell's String Quartet in A major, Op. 65 The Hako, composed in 1923, was inspired by Fletcher's work.

Joan Mark's book about Fletcher, A Stranger in Her Native Land: Alice Fletcher and the American Indians (Lincoln: University of Nebraska Press, 1988) received the 1989 Margaret W. Rossiter History of Women in Science Prize.

Fletcher Nunatak in Antarctica is named after her.

== Awards and honors ==
Alice Fletcher received numerous honors for the work she accomplished throughout her career. In 1890 she was awarded the Margaret Copley Thaw Fellowship at Harvard, which granted her funding for ethnographic and reform work.

== Selected works ==
- Sun Dance of the Ogallala Sioux. American Association for the Advancement of Science, 1883
- Observations on the Laws and Privileges of the Gens in Indian Society. (abstract) AAAS, 1884
- Symbolic Earth Formations of the Winnebagoes. (abstract) AAAS, 1884
- The White Buffalo Festival of the Uncpapas. 16th Annual Report Peabody Museum, 1884
- The Elk Mystery or Festival of the Ogallala Sioux. 16th Ann. Rep. Peabody Museum, 1884
- The Religious Ceremony of the Four Winds as Observed by a Santee Sioux. 16th Ann. Rep. Peabody Museum, 1884
- The Shadow or Ghost Lodge: A Ceremony of the Ogallala Sioux. 16th Ann. Rep. Peabody Museum, 1884
- The Wa-Wan, or Pipe Dance of the Omahas. 16th Ann. Rep. Peabody Museum, 1884
- Historical Sketch of the Omaha Tribe of Indians in Nebraska. Washington, 1885
- Observations upon the Usage, Symbolism and Influence of the Sacred Pipes
- Of Friendship among the Omahas. AAAS, 1885
- Lands in Severalty to Indians; Illustrated by Experience with the Omaha Tribe. AAAS, 1885
- Indian Education and Civilization. Special Report, U.S. Bureau of Education. 1888
- On the Preservation of Archaeologic Monuments. AAAS, 1888
- Report of the Committee on the Preservation of Archaeologic Remains on Public Lands. AAAS, 1889
- Phonetic Alphabet of the Winnebago Indians. AAAS, 1890
- Indian Messiah. Journal. American Folk-Lore, 1892
- Nez Perce Country. (abstract) AAAS, 1892
- Hal-thu-ska Society of the Omaha Tribe. Jour. Am. Folk-Lore, 1892
- A Study of Omaha Indian Music. Arch. and Eth. Papers Peabody Museum, 1893
- Love Songs among the Omaha Indians. International Congress of Anthropologists, 1894
- Indian Songs: Personal Studies of Indian Life. Century Magazine, 1894
- Hunting Customs of the Omahas. Century Magazine, 1895
- Sacred Pole of the Omaha Tribe. AAAS, 1896
- Indian Songs and Music. AAAS, 1896
- Tribal Life among the Omahas. Century Magazine, 1896
- Emblematic Use of the Tree in the Dakotan Group. AAAS, 1897
- Indian Songs and Music. Jour. Amer. Folk-Lore, 1898
- A Pawnee Ritual Used When Changing a Man's Name. American Anthropologist, 1899
- Indian Story and Song from North America. Boston, 1900
- Giving Thanks: A Pawnee Ceremony. Jour. Am. Folk-Lore, 1900
- The "Lazy Man" in Indian Lore. Jour. Am. Folk-Lore, 1901
- Star Cult among the Pawnee. Am. Anthrop., 1902
- Pawnee Star Lore. Jour. Am. Folk-Lore, 1903
- The Hako: A Pawnee Ceremony. 22nd Ann. Rep. Bu. Am. Eth., 1904
- Tribal Structure: A Study of the Omaha and Cognate Tribes. Putnam Anniversary Volume, 1909
- The Omaha Tribe. (With Francis La Flesche). 27th Ann. Rep. Bu. Am. Eth., 1911
- The Problems of the Unity or Plurality and the Probable Place of Origin of The American Aborigines. (A Symposium) Some Ethnological Aspects of the Problem. Am. Anthrop., 1912
- Wakondagi. Am. Anthrop., 1912
- Brief History of the International Congress of Americanists. Am. Anthrop., 1913
- Indian Games and Dances with Native Songs Arranged from American Indian Ceremonials and Sports. Boston, 1915
- The Study of Indian Music. National Academy of Science, 1915
- The Indian and Nature: The Basis of His Tribal Organization and Rites. The Red Man, 1916
- A Birthday Wish from Native America. Washington, 1916
- Nature and the Indian Tribe. Art and Archaeology, 1916
- Concepts of Nature among the American Natives. (abstract) 19th Internat. Cong. Amer., 1917
- Prayers Voiced in Ancient America. Art and Arch., 1920
