= Pimpirev Ice Wall =

Slope in Livingston Island, Antarctica

Location of Livingston Island in the South Shetland Islands.

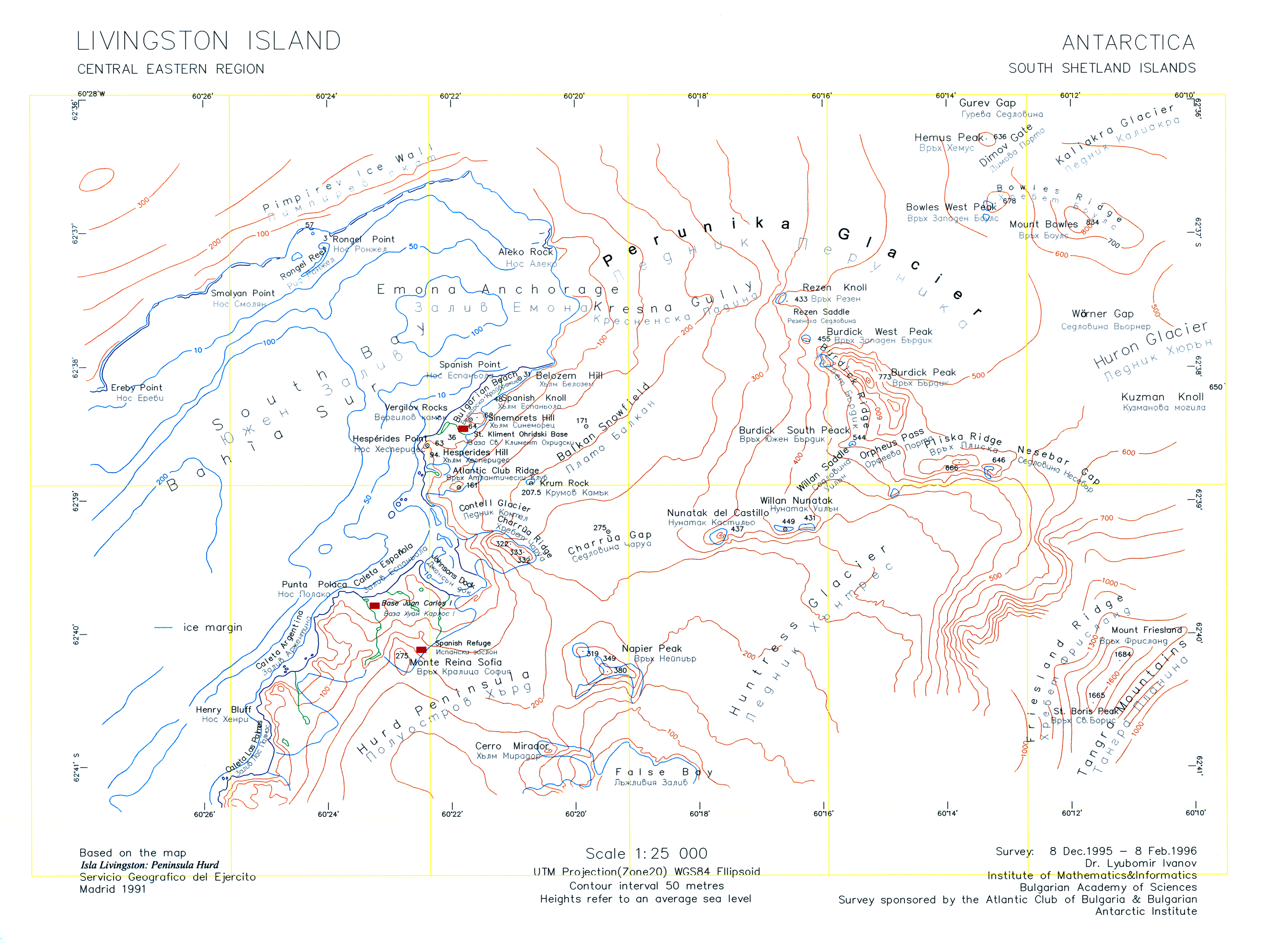
Topographic map of central-eastern Livingston Island featuring Pimpirev Ice Wall.

Topographic map of Livingston Island, Greenwich, Robert, Snow and Smith Islands.

Pimpirev Ice Wall (62°37′S 60°24′W) is the rectilinear ice slope running parallel to and some 100 m inland from the northwest coast of Emona Harbour in Livingston Island, Antarctica. Approx. 50 m high, extending from the north corner of Emona Harbour 3,700 m in west-southwest direction. Named for Christo Pimpirev, leader of the Bulgarian Antarctic campaigns during the 1993/94, 1994/95, 1995/96, and subsequent seasons, who also conducted geological field work on Alexander Island during the summer of 1987/88.

== Maps ==
- L.L. Ivanov. Livingston Island: Central-Eastern Region. Scale 1:25000 topographic map. Sofia: Antarctic Place-names Commission of Bulgaria, 1996.
- L.L. Ivanov et al. Antarctica: Livingston Island and Greenwich Island, South Shetland Islands. Scale 1:100000 topographic map. Sofia: Antarctic Place-names Commission of Bulgaria, 2005.
- L.L. Ivanov. Antarctica: Livingston Island and Greenwich, Robert, Snow and Smith Islands. Scale 1:120000 topographic map. Troyan: Manfred Wörner Foundation, 2009. ISBN 978-954-92032-6-4
