= Emona Anchorage =

Roughly square embayment in the South Shetland Islands, Antarctica

Location of Livingston Island in the South Shetland Islands.

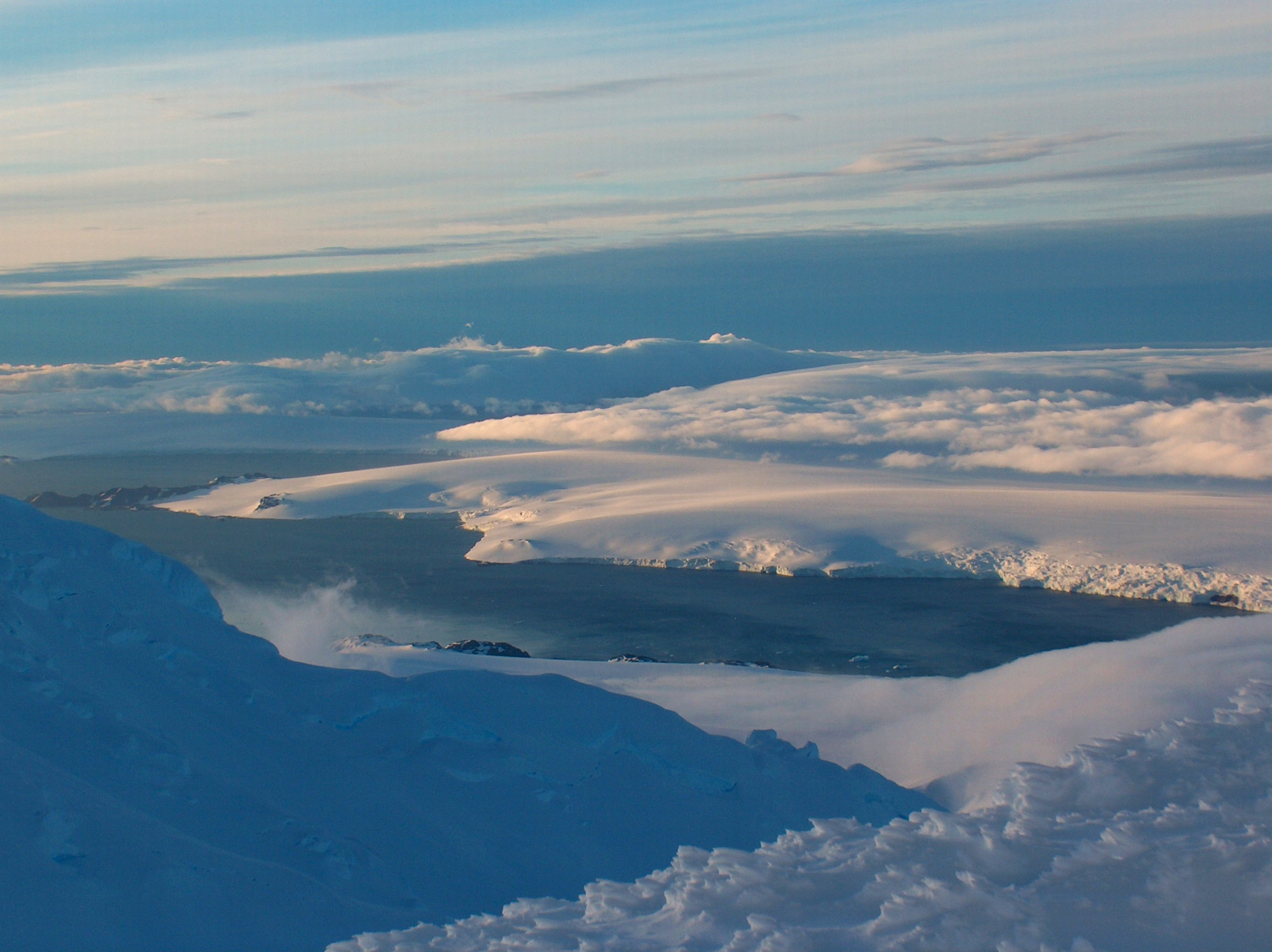
Emona Anchorage from Lyaskovets Peak in Tangra Mountains.

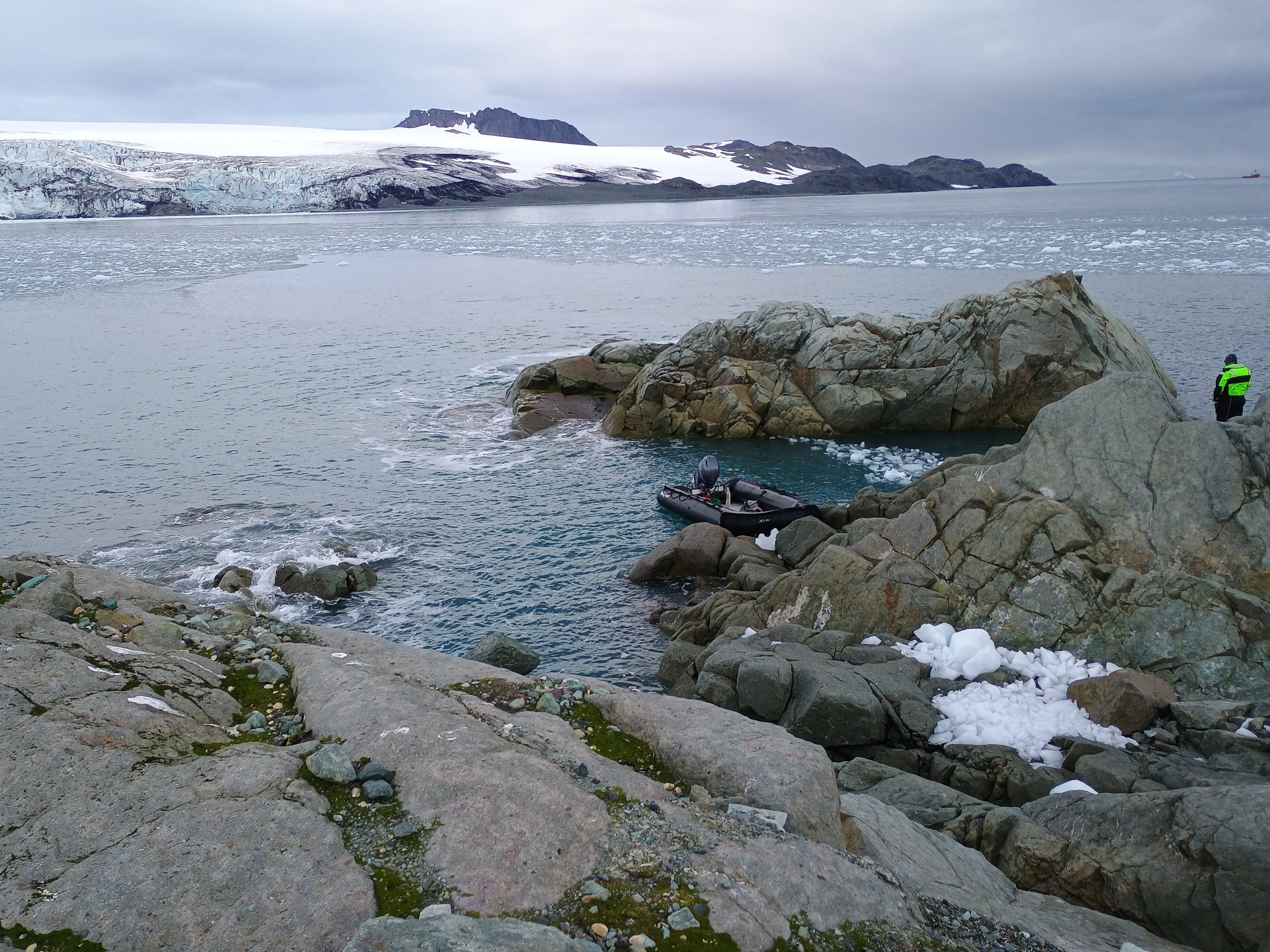
Emona Anchorage and Bulgarian Beach from Aleko Point.

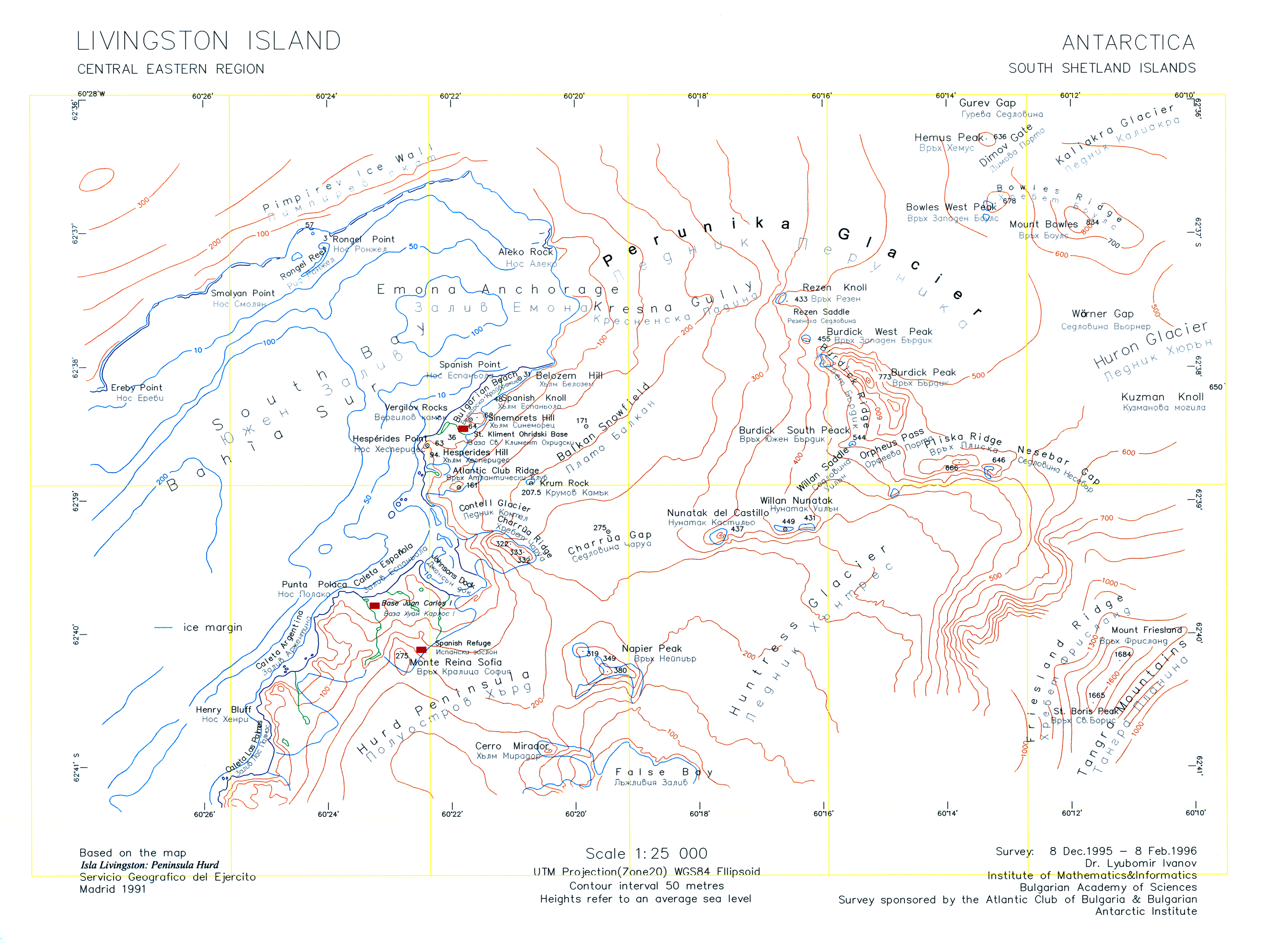
Topographic map of central-eastern Livingston Island featuring Emona Anchorage.

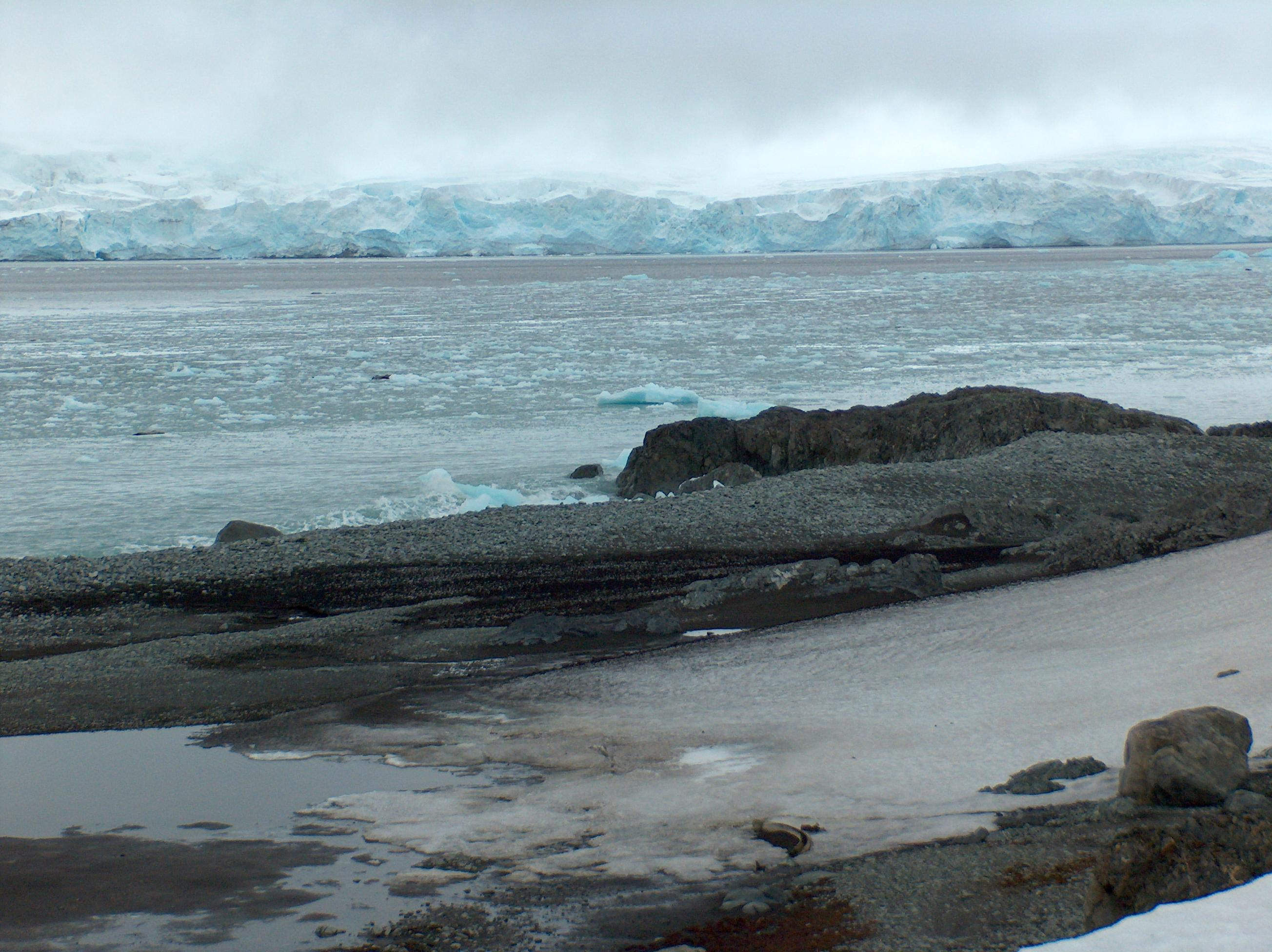
Emona Anchorage from the Bulgarian base, with Greenpeace Rock on the right.

Topographic map of Livingston Island.

Emona Anchorage (Bulgarian: залив Емона, romanized: zaliv Emona, IPA: [ˈzalif ɛˈmɔnɐ]) is a roughly square embayment, the internal part of South Bay, Livingston Island in the South Shetland Islands, Antarctica used as an anchorage for ships visiting the Bulgarian base St. Kliment Ohridski.

Emona is the name of a village and, in the version of Emine, a nearby cape on the Bulgarian Black Sea Coast.

== Location ==
The feature is centred at 62°37′35″S 60°22′20″W.

== Details ==
Entered between Hespérides Point and Smolyan Point, the bay is over 100 m deep at its central portion northwest by north of Spanish Point. Northeast of Smolyan Point, a nameless 710 m wide cove is indenting for 250 m behind Rongel Reef, with a shoal east of that cape, and a small awash islet 550 m due northeast of it. Rongel Point forms the east-northeast side of that cove's entrance. The remaining northwest coast of Emona Anchorage is, with several minor disruptions, a narrow beach under the ice-cap cliff, with Pimpirev Ice Wall, an ice form in Pimpirev Glacier running parallelly some 100 m inland. That section of the coast is 2.15 km long, featuring a single minor point lying 3.51 km north of Hespérides Point and 1.97 km west-northwest of Aleko Point. An ice sea cave located 870 m east-northeast of that point and 1.45 km northwest of Aleko Point marks the beach end and the north corner of the bay. The northeast coast except for Aleko Point is formed by Perunika Glacier's snout, while Bulgarian Beach accounts for most of the southeast coast, featuring Vergilov Rocks 100 m offshore. The Emona Anchorage beaches and drifting sea ice are favoured by a fairly small number of penguins and seals, usually comprising chinstrap, gentoo and Adelie penguins, and Weddell, crabeater, leopard and incidentally fur seals.

== Mapping ==
As a part of South Bay, it appears on earliest charts of the area. Detailed mapping in 1991 by the Servicio Geográfico del Ejército with bathymetry by the Instituto Hidrogràfico de la Marina, Spain. Glacier retreat from bay waters indicated by a 1991 satellite image and further regression recorded in February 1995. Bulgarian remapping of the modified coastal configuration from a ground survey made during the summer of 1995–96. The 1996, 2005 and 2009 Bulgarian mapping of Livingston Island indicated continuing glacier retreat on the northeast side of the bay.

== See also ==
- St. Kliment Ohridski Base
- Bulgarian Beach
- Livingston Island

== Maps ==
- Isla Livingston: Península Hurd. Mapa topográfico de escala 1:25 000. Madrid: Servicio Geográfico del Ejército, 1991.
- L.L. Ivanov. Livingston Island: Central-Eastern Region. Scale 1:25000 topographic map. Sofia: Antarctic Place-names Commission of Bulgaria, 1996.
- L.L. Ivanov et al. Antarctica: Livingston Island and Greenwich Island, South Shetland Islands. Scale 1:100000 topographic map. Sofia: Antarctic Place-names Commission of Bulgaria, 2005.
- L.L. Ivanov. Antarctica: Livingston Island and Greenwich, Robert, Snow and Smith Islands. Scale 1:120000 topographic map. Troyan: Manfred Wörner Foundation, 2009.
- Antarctica, South Shetland Islands, Livingston Island: Bulgarian Antarctic Base. Sheets 1 and 2. Scale 1:2000 topographic map. Geodesy, Cartography and Cadastre Agency, 2016. (in Bulgarian)
- L.L. Ivanov. Antarctica: Livingston Island and Smith Island. Scale 1:100000 topographic map. Manfred Wörner Foundation, 2017. ISBN 978-619-90008-3-0
