= Aleko Point =

Headland in Antarctica

Location of Livingston Island in the South Shetland Islands.

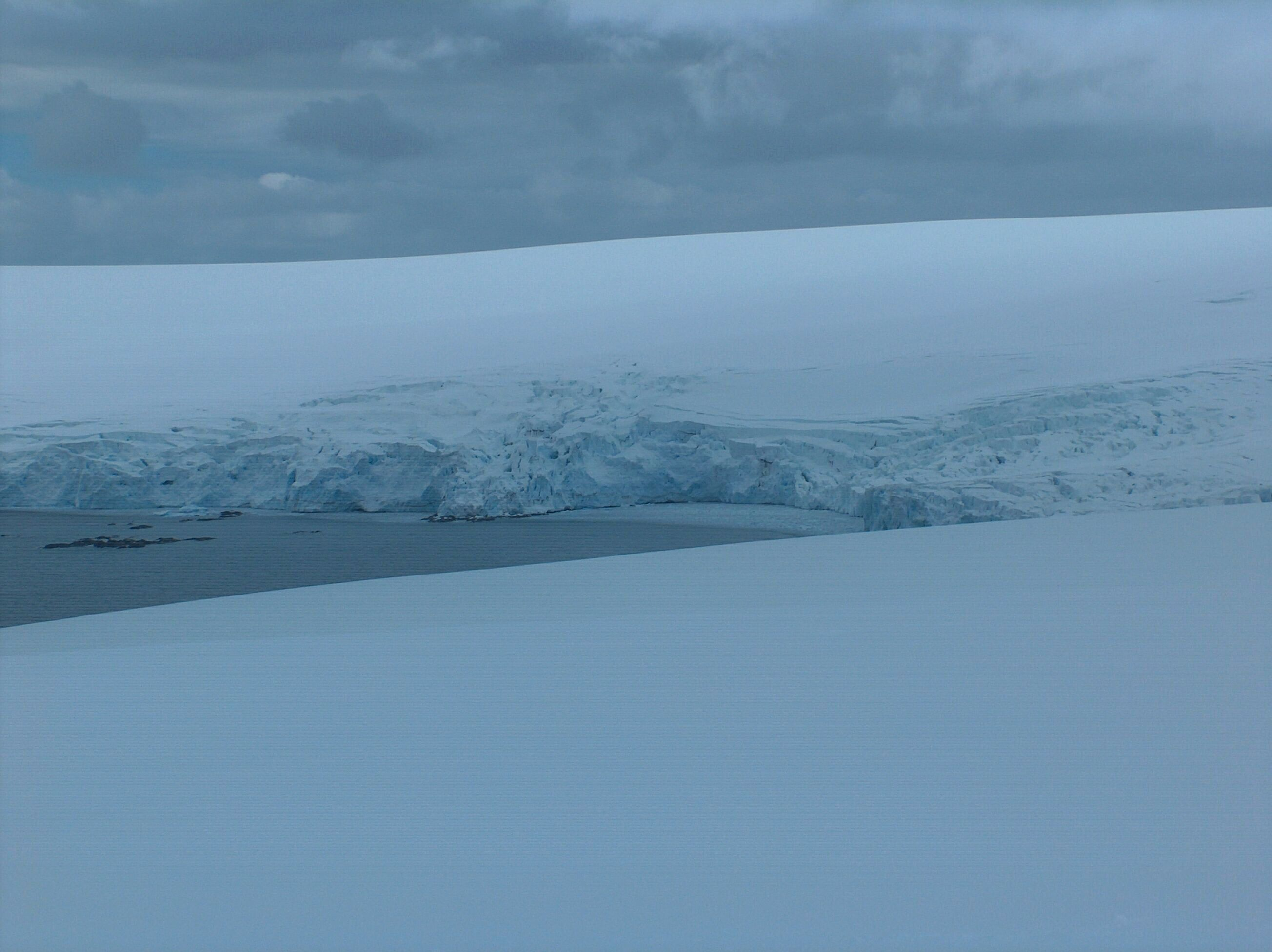
Aleko Point from Balkan Snowfield.

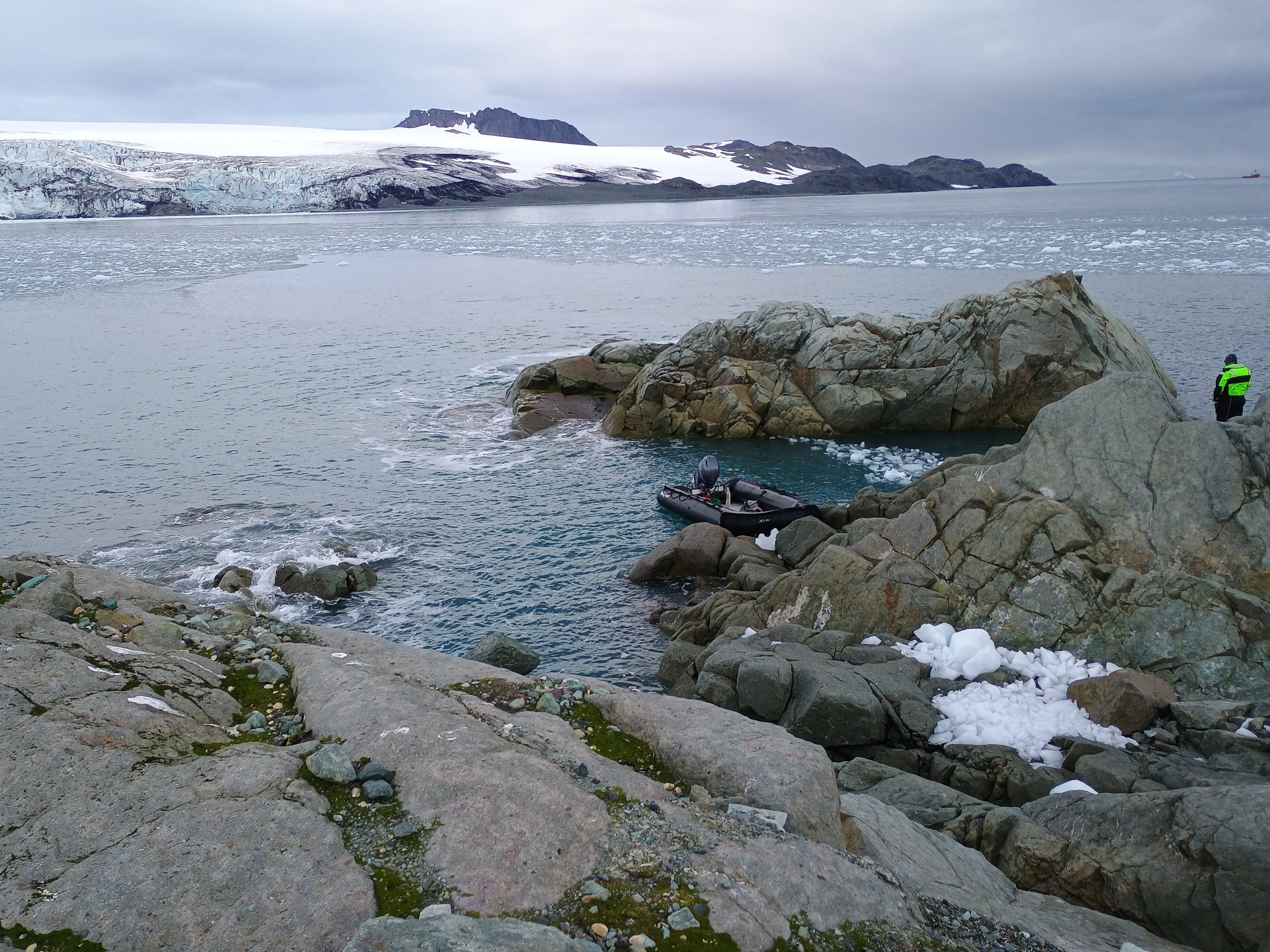
Bulgarian Beach and Emona Anchorage from Aleko Point.

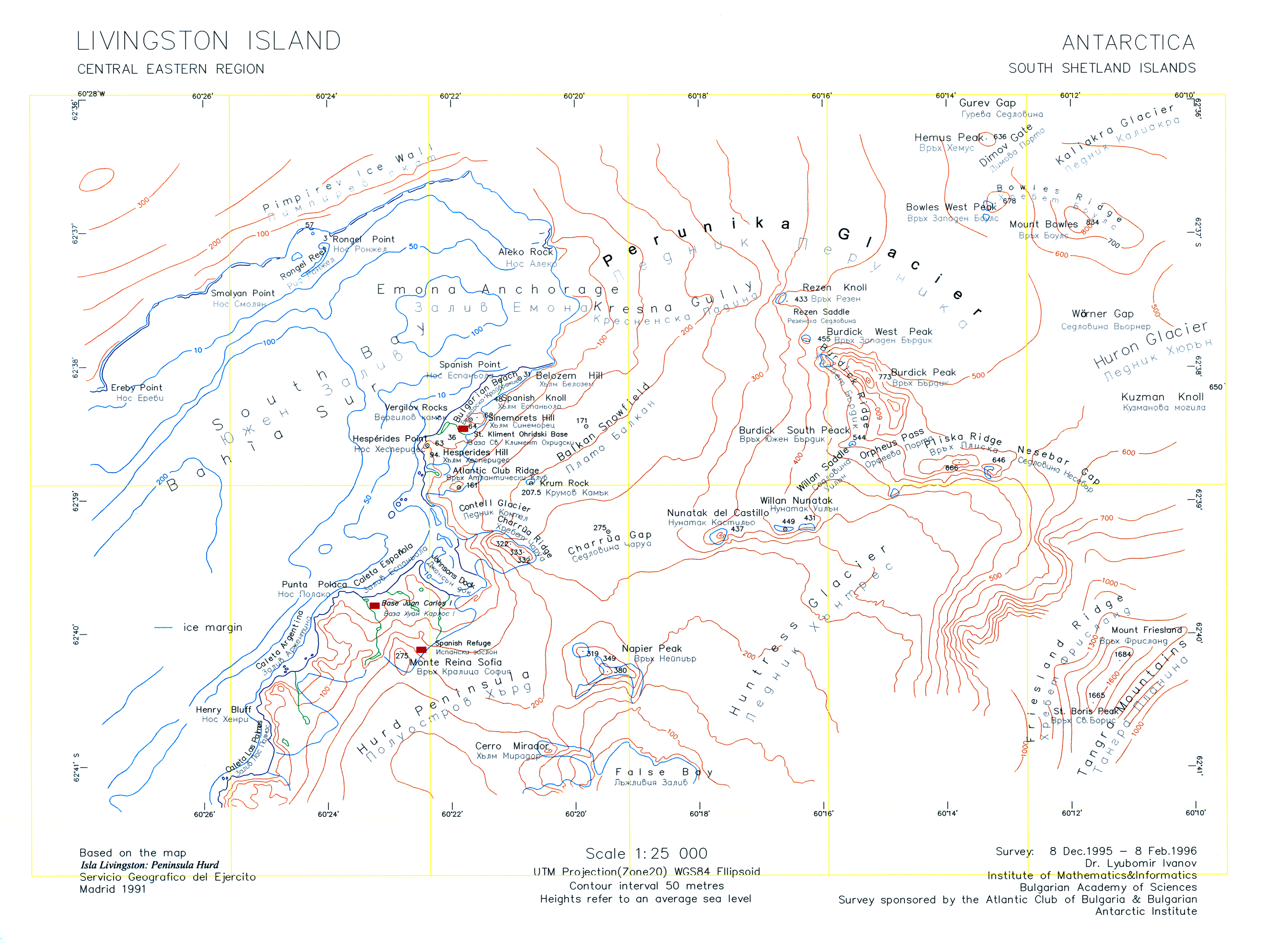
Topographic map of central-eastern Livingston Island featuring Aleko Point.

Topographic map of Livingston Island, Greenwich, Robert, Snow and Smith Islands.

Aleko Point (Nos Aleko \'nos a-'le-ko\), also Aleko Rock, is a rocky point midway along the northeast Antarctic coast of Emona Anchorage in the east of Livingston Island, projecting 150m to the west of southwest.

A nameless 400m wide cove is indented for 250m to the north of northwest, with two chains of rocks extending 80m and 50m in a westerly direction. The cove's head features three rocks which are awash at high tide, the westernmost one lying 320m north of Aleko Point, while a larger rock rising to over 4m is located 90m southeast of the point.

The point emerged during a recent glacier retreat and was first recorded in the Bulgarian recording of February 1995. The rock was mapped from a topographic survey of the region made from December 8, 1995, to February 8, 1996.

Aleko is the name of a peak of Rila Mountain and a site on Vitosha Mountain, named after Aleko Konstantinov (1863–97), a prominent writer and proponent of wilderness exploration.

== Location ==
Aleko Point is located at 62°37′03.2″S 60°20′04″W which is 2 km north-northeast of Spanish Point, 3.58 km northeast by north of Hespérides Point and 6.71 km east-northeast of Ereby Point.

== See also ==
- List of Bulgarian toponyms in Antarctica
- Antarctic Place-names Commission

== Maps ==
- L.L. Ivanov et al. Antarctica: Livingston Island and Greenwich Island, South Shetland Islands. Scale 1:100000 topographic map. Sofia: Antarctic Place-names Commission of Bulgaria, 2005.
- L.L. Ivanov. Antarctica: Livingston Island and Greenwich, Robert, Snow and Smith Islands. Scale 1:120000 topographic map. Troyan: Manfred Wörner Foundation, 2009.
