= Tundzha Glacier =

Glacier in Antarctica

- Location of Livingston Island in the South Shetland Islands

- Location within South Shetland Islands Location within Antarctica
- Location: Livingston Island; South Shetland Islands
- Coordinates: 62°35′40″S 60°30′30″W
- Length: 7.5 nautical miles (13.9 km; 8.6 mi)
- Width: 2.4 nautical miles (4.4 km; 2.8 mi)
- Thickness: unknown
- Terminus: Hero Bay
- Status: unknown

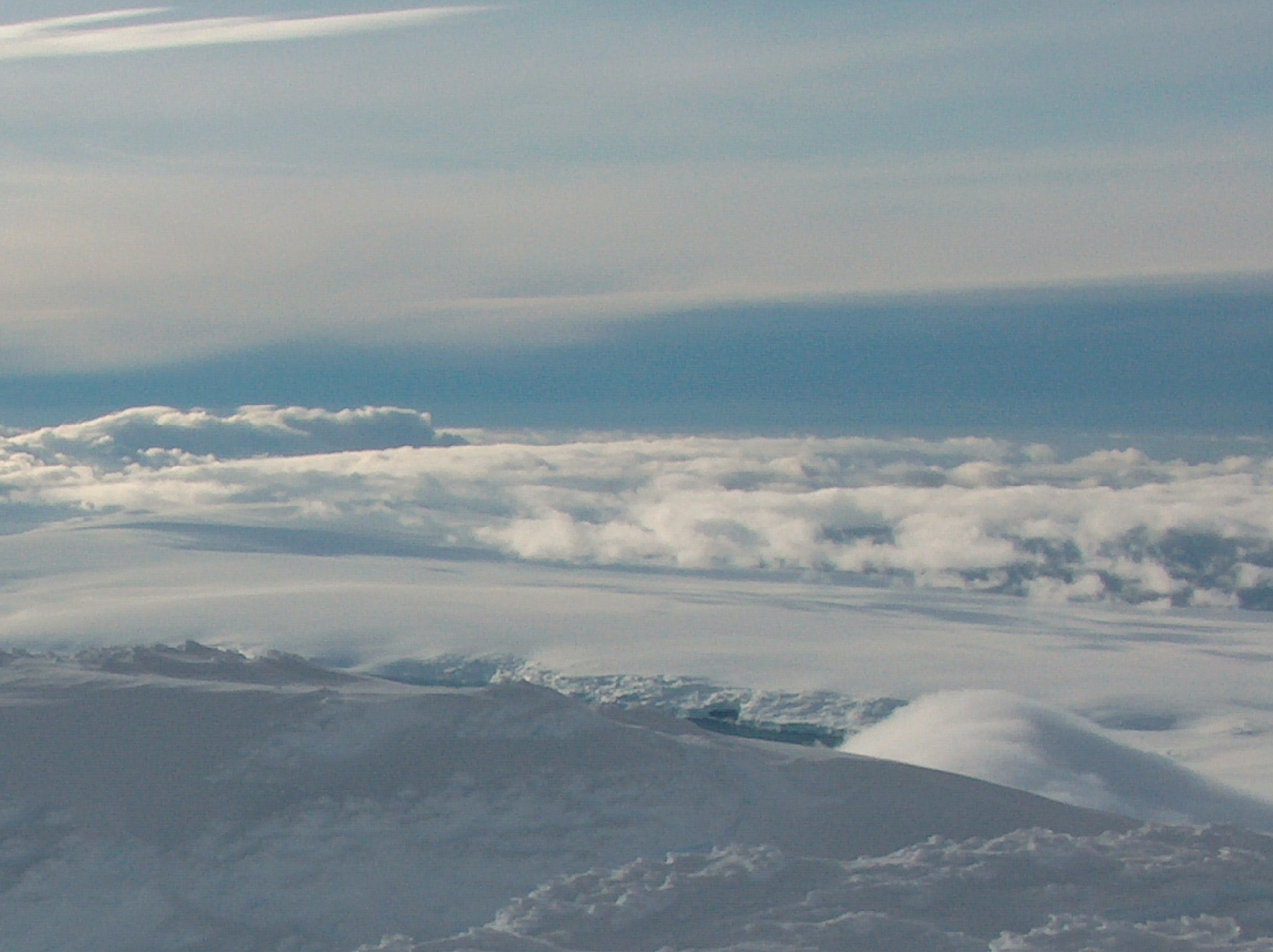
Tundzha Glacier (on the far side) from Lyaskovets Peak.

Topographic map of Livingston Island and Smith Island

Tundzha Glacier (Bulgarian: ледник Тунджа, romanized: lednik Tundzha, IPA: [ˈlɛdnik ˈtund͡ʒɐ]) is a glacier on Livingston Island in the South Shetland Islands, Antarctica situated east-southeast of Berkovitsa Glacier, west of Saedinenie Snowfield, northwest of Pimpirev Glacier, north of Kamchiya Glacier, and east-northeast of Verila Glacier. It is bounded by Snow Peak to the west, Teres Ridge to the east and the glacial divide between the Drake Passage and Bransfield Strait to the south. The glacier extends 7.5 nautical miles (13.9 km; 8.6 mi) in east-west direction and 2.4 nautical miles (4.4 km; 2.8 mi) in the north-south direction, and drains northwards into Hero Bay between Avitohol Point and Siddins Point.

The feature was named after the Tundzha River in Bulgaria.

== Location ==
The midpoint of the glacier is located at 62°35′40″S 60°30′30″W (Bulgarian mapping in 2009).

== See also ==
- List of glaciers in the Antarctic
- Glaciology

== Maps ==
- L.L. Ivanov et al. Antarctica: Livingston Island and Greenwich Island, South Shetland Islands. Scale 1:100000 topographic map. Sofia: Antarctic Place-names Commission of Bulgaria, 2005.
- L.L. Ivanov. Antarctica: Livingston Island and Greenwich, Robert, Snow and Smith Islands. Scale 1:120000 topographic map. Troyan: Manfred Wörner Foundation, 2010. ISBN 978-954-92032-9-5 (First edition 2009. ISBN 978-954-92032-6-4)
- Antarctic Digital Database (ADD). Scale 1:250000 topographic map of Antarctica. Scientific Committee on Antarctic Research (SCAR). Since 1993, regularly upgraded and updated.
- L.L. Ivanov. Antarctica: Livingston Island and Smith Island. Scale 1:100000 topographic map. Manfred Wörner Foundation, 2017. ISBN 978-619-90008-3-0
