= Avitohol Point =

Point of Livingston Island, South Shetland Islands, Antarctica

Location of Livingston Island in the South Shetland Islands.

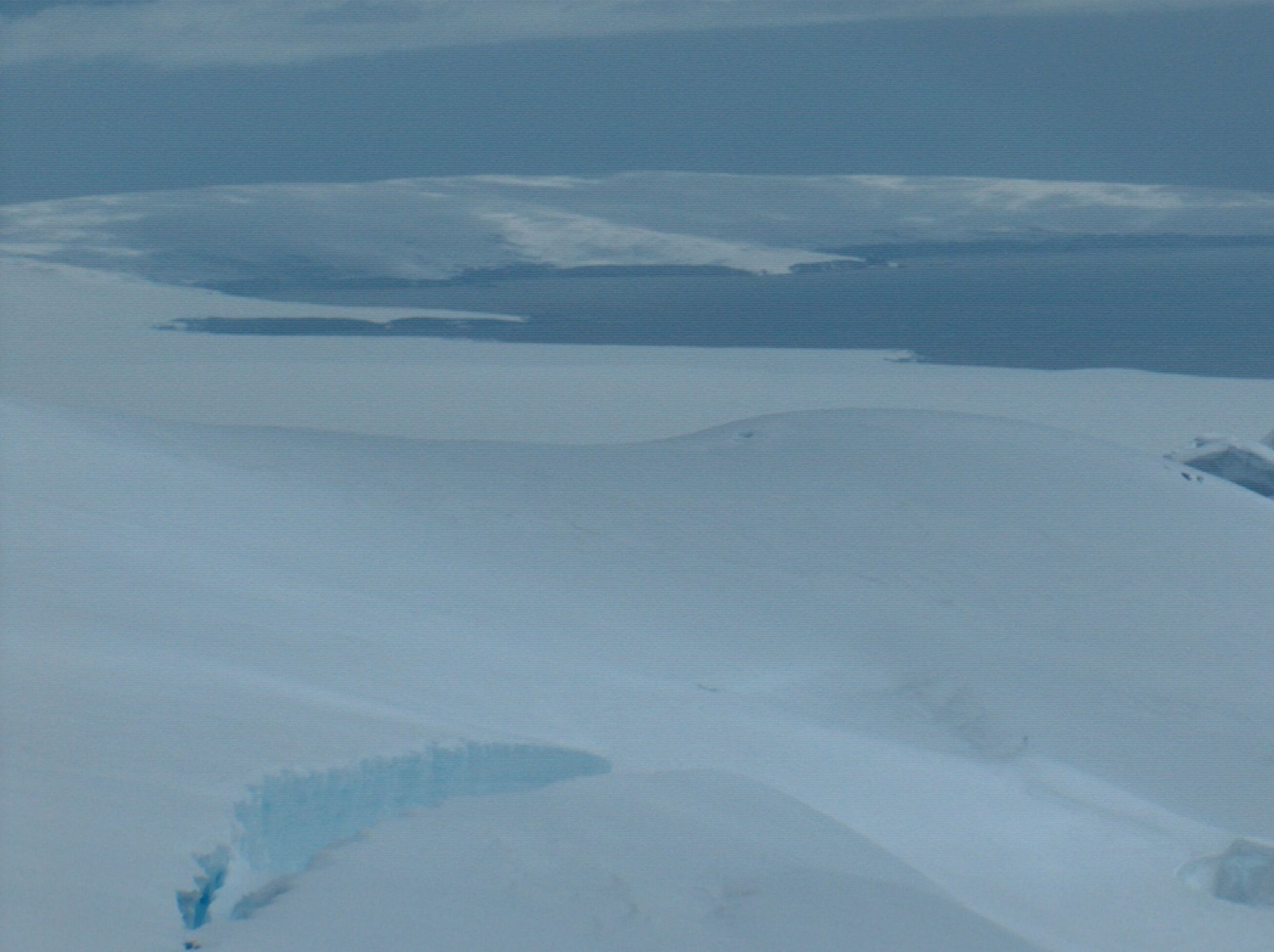
Avitohol Point

Topographic map of Livingston Island and Smith Island.

Avitohol Point (Bulgarian: нос Авитохол, romanized: nos Avitohol, IPA: [ˈnɔs ɐvitoˈxɔɫ]) is a point on the north coast of Livingston Island, Antarctica projecting 1.15 km (0.71 mi) into Hero Bay to form the west side of the entrance to Skravena Cove and the southeast side of the entrance to Prisoe Cove. It is surmounted by Fletcher Nunatak and Belev Nunatak. The point is named after the legendary Khan Avitohol listed in the 8th Century Nominalia of the Bulgarian Khans, who laid the foundations of the Bulgarian statehood in Europe in 165 AD.

== Location ==
The point is located at 62°33′54″S 60°37′05″W which is 3 km (1.9 mi) northeast of Snow Peak, 9.6 km (6.0 mi) west-southwest of Siddins Point, 10 km (6.2 mi) south-southeast of Black Point and 14.6 km (9.1 mi) southeast of Cape Shirreff.

The point was mapped by Bulgaria in 2005 and 2009 and is registered in the SCAR Composite Antarctic Gazetteer.

== See also ==
- Livingston Island

== Maps ==
- L.L. Ivanov et al. Antarctica: Livingston Island and Greenwich Island, South Shetland Islands. Scale 1:100000 topographic map. Sofia: Antarctic Place-names Commission of Bulgaria, 2005.
- L.L. Ivanov. Antarctica: Livingston Island and Greenwich, Robert, Snow and Smith Islands. Scale 1:120000 topographic map. Troyan: Manfred Wörner Foundation, 2009.
- L.L. Ivanov. Antarctica: Livingston Island and Smith Island. Scale 1:100000 topographic map. Manfred Wörner Foundation, 2017. ISBN 978-619-90008-3-0
