= Ereby Point =

Geographic point in the South Shetland Islands, Antarctica

Location of Livingston Island in the South Shetland Islands.

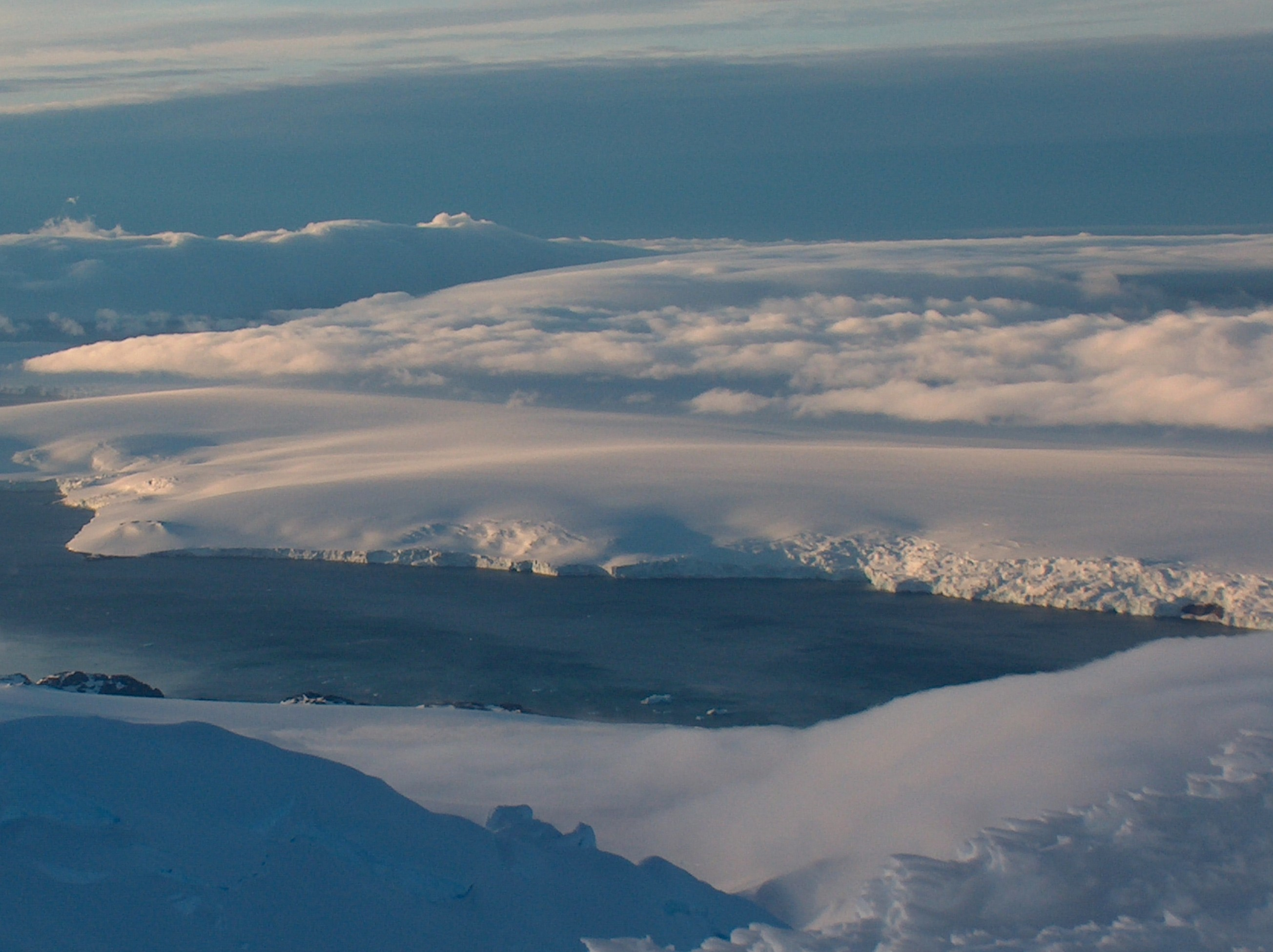
Emona Anchorage from Lyaskovets Peak, with Ereby Point on the left.

Topographic map of Livingston Island.

Ereby Point (62°38′S 60°27′W) is a point lying 4.5 miles (7.2 km) east-northeast of Hannah Point along the north side of South Bay, Livingston Island in the South Shetland Islands, Antarctica. The name "Erebys Bay" was applied to South Bay on an 1825 chart by James Weddell, "Ereby Point" was applied by the UK Antarctic Place-names Committee in 1961 in order to preserve Weddell's name in the area.

== Maps ==
- L.L. Ivanov et al. Antarctica: Livingston Island and Greenwich Island, South Shetland Islands. Scale 1:100000 topographic map. Sofia: Antarctic Place-names Commission of Bulgaria, 2005.
- L.L. Ivanov. Antarctica: Livingston Island and Greenwich, Robert, Snow and Smith Islands. Scale 1:120000 topographic map. Troyan: Manfred Wörner Foundation, 2009. ISBN 978-954-92032-6-4
- Antarctic Digital Database (ADD). Scale 1:250000 topographic map of Antarctica. Scientific Committee on Antarctic Research (SCAR). Since 1993, regularly upgraded and updated.
- L.L. Ivanov. Antarctica: Livingston Island and Smith Island. Scale 1:100000 topographic map. Manfred Wörner Foundation, 2017. ISBN 978-619-90008-3-0
