= Sea lion (disambiguation) =

A sea lion is a type of eared seal.

Sea Lion, Sealion, Sea-lion, or Sea Lions may also refer to:

== Music ==
- Sea Lion (album), by The Ruby Suns, 2008
- "Sea Lion" (song), by Sage Francis, 2005
- “Sea Lion”, a song by Yuno Miles, 2026

== Military ==
- Operation Sea Lion, the planned German invasion of Great Britain during World War II
- Operation Sea Lion (wargame), a 1974 wargame to test the World War II scenario
- HMS Sealion, two submarines and one land base of the British Royal Navy
- USS Sealion, two U.S. Navy submarines
- NH90 Sea Lion, the German Navy variant of the NHIndustries NH90 helicopter

== Places ==
- Sea Lion Glacier, Antarctica
- Sea Lion Tarn, a tarn (mountain lake or pool) adjacent to the glacier
- Sea Lion Caves, Oregon, United States
- Sea Lion Island, one of the Falkland Islands
- Sea Lion Rock, near Kamchatka Peninsula, Russia

== Other ==
- Merlion, official mascot of Singapore
- The Sea Lion, a 1921 American silent film
- Sea-lion, in heraldry, a mythical creature consisting of the head and front limbs of a lion with the tail of a fish
- Supermarine Sea Lion, a series of British racing flying boats
- Sea Lion (steam locomotive), a steam locomotive on the Groudle Glen Railway
- Sea Lion (battery-electric locomotive), a 1920s locomotive on the Groudle Glen Railway
- Sea Lion Park, an amusement park on Coney Island between 1895 and 1903
- Sealioning, a form of Internet trolling
- BYD Sealion, a series of SUV
- Sea Lions of the Galapagos, a 2025 American nature documentary
- Thalassoleon, an extinct genus of large fur seal
