= Sea Lion Glacier =

Glacier in the South Shetland Islands, Antarctica

- Location of Varna Peninsula on Livingston Island in the South Shetland Islands

- Location within South Shetland Islands Location within Antarctica
- Location: Livingston Island; South Shetland Islands
- Coordinates: 62°38′46″S 60°22′12″W
- Length: 0.2 nautical miles (0.37 km; 0.23 mi)
- Thickness: unknown
- Terminus: South Bay
- Status: unknown

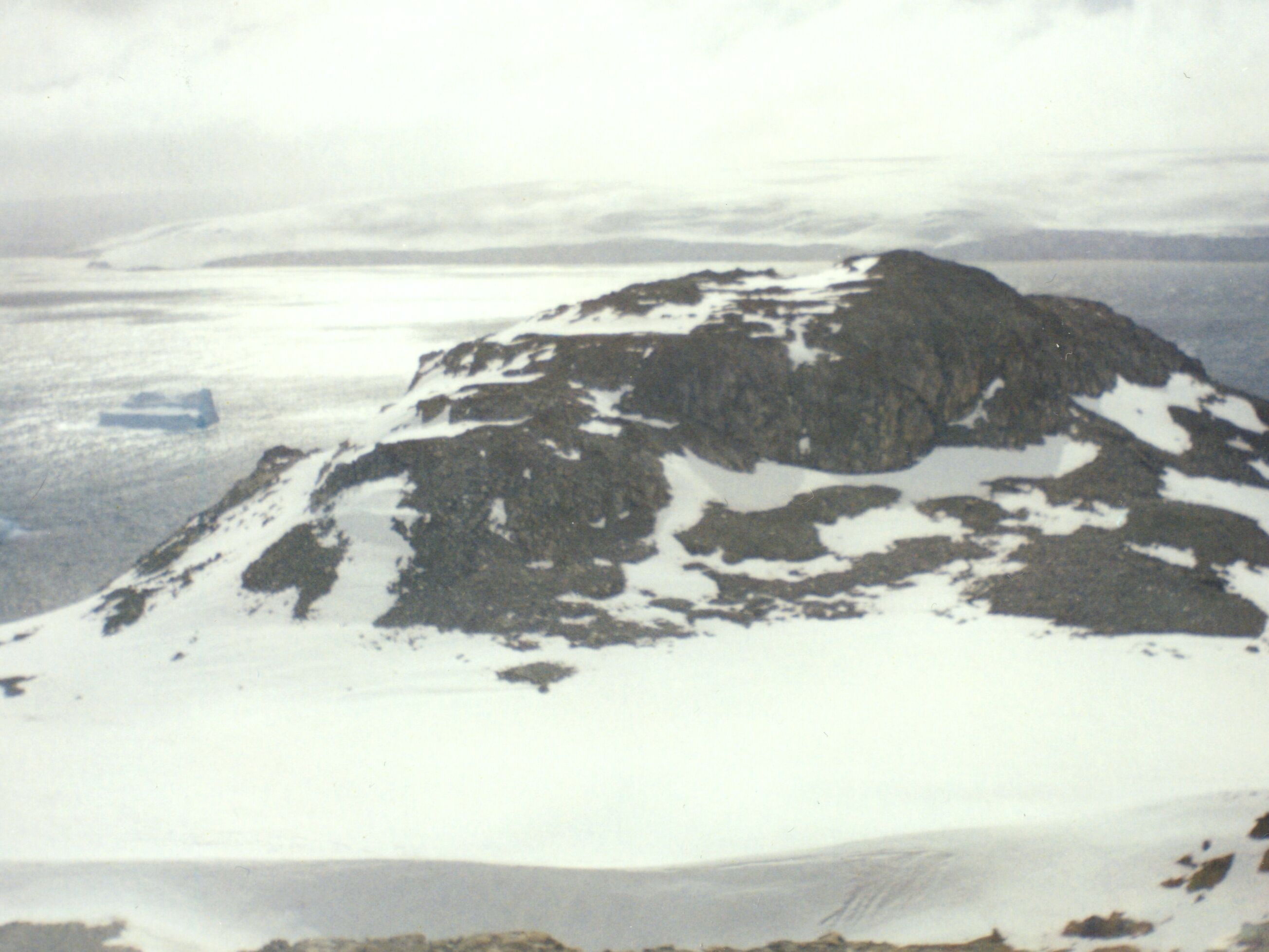
Sea Lion Glacier in 1995 from Atlantic Club Ridge, with Hesperides Hill in the background.

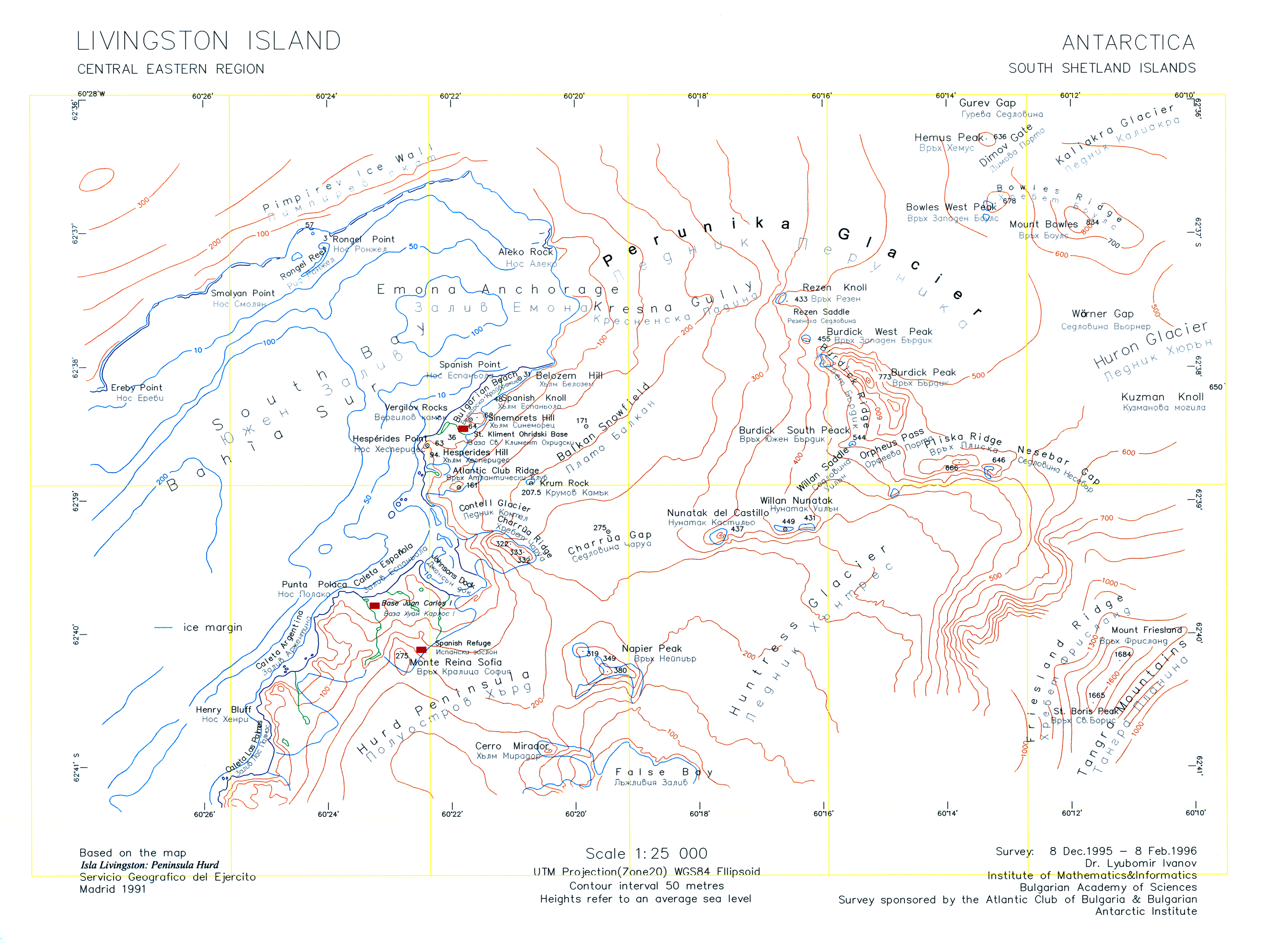
A 1996 topographic map of central-eastern Livingston Island featuring Sea Lion Glacier.

Topographic map of Livingston Island and Smith Island

Sea Lion Glacier (Bulgarian: ледник Морски Лъв, romanized: lednik Morski Lav, IPA: [ˈlɛdnik ˈmɔrski ˈɫɤf]) is the site of an isolated 350 metres (1,150 ft) long glacier on Hurd Peninsula, eastern Livingston Island in the South Shetland Islands, Antarctica. It is located southwest of Hesperides Hill and northwest of Atlantic Club Ridge, separated from the latter by Sea Lion Tarn, and terminating on the South Bay coast.

The glacier, subject of glaciological studies and monitoring for several years since 1993, disappeared completely within a decade.

== Location ==
The midpoint is located at 62°38′46″S 60°22′12″W (Bulgarian mapping from a 1995–1996 ground survey).

== See also ==
- List of glaciers in the Antarctic
- Glaciology

== Maps ==
- Isla Livingston: Península Hurd. Mapa topográfico de escala 1:25000. Madrid: Servicio Geográfico del Ejército, 1991. (Map reproduced on p. 16 of the linked work)
- L.L. Ivanov. Livingston Island: Central-Eastern Region. Scale 1:25000 topographic map. Sofia: Antarctic Place-names Commission of Bulgaria, 1996.
- L.L. Ivanov et al. Antarctica: Livingston Island and Greenwich Island, South Shetland Islands. Scale 1:100000 topographic map. Sofia: Antarctic Place-names Commission of Bulgaria, 2005.
- L.L. Ivanov. Antarctica: Livingston Island and Greenwich, Robert, Snow and Smith Islands. Scale 1:120000 topographic map. Troyan: Manfred Wörner Foundation, 2009. ISBN 978-954-92032-6-4
- Antarctica, South Shetland Islands, Livingston Island: Bulgarian Antarctic Base. Sheets 1 and 2. Scale 1:2000 topographic map. Geodesy, Cartography and Cadastre Agency, 2016. (in Bulgarian)
- Antarctic Digital Database (ADD). Scale 1:250000 topographic map of Antarctica. Scientific Committee on Antarctic Research (SCAR). Since 1993, regularly upgraded and updated.
- L.L. Ivanov. Antarctica: Livingston Island and Smith Island. Scale 1:100000 topographic map. Manfred Wörner Foundation, 2017. ISBN 978-619-90008-3-0
