= Hesperides Hill =

Ridge in the South Shetland Islands, Antarctica

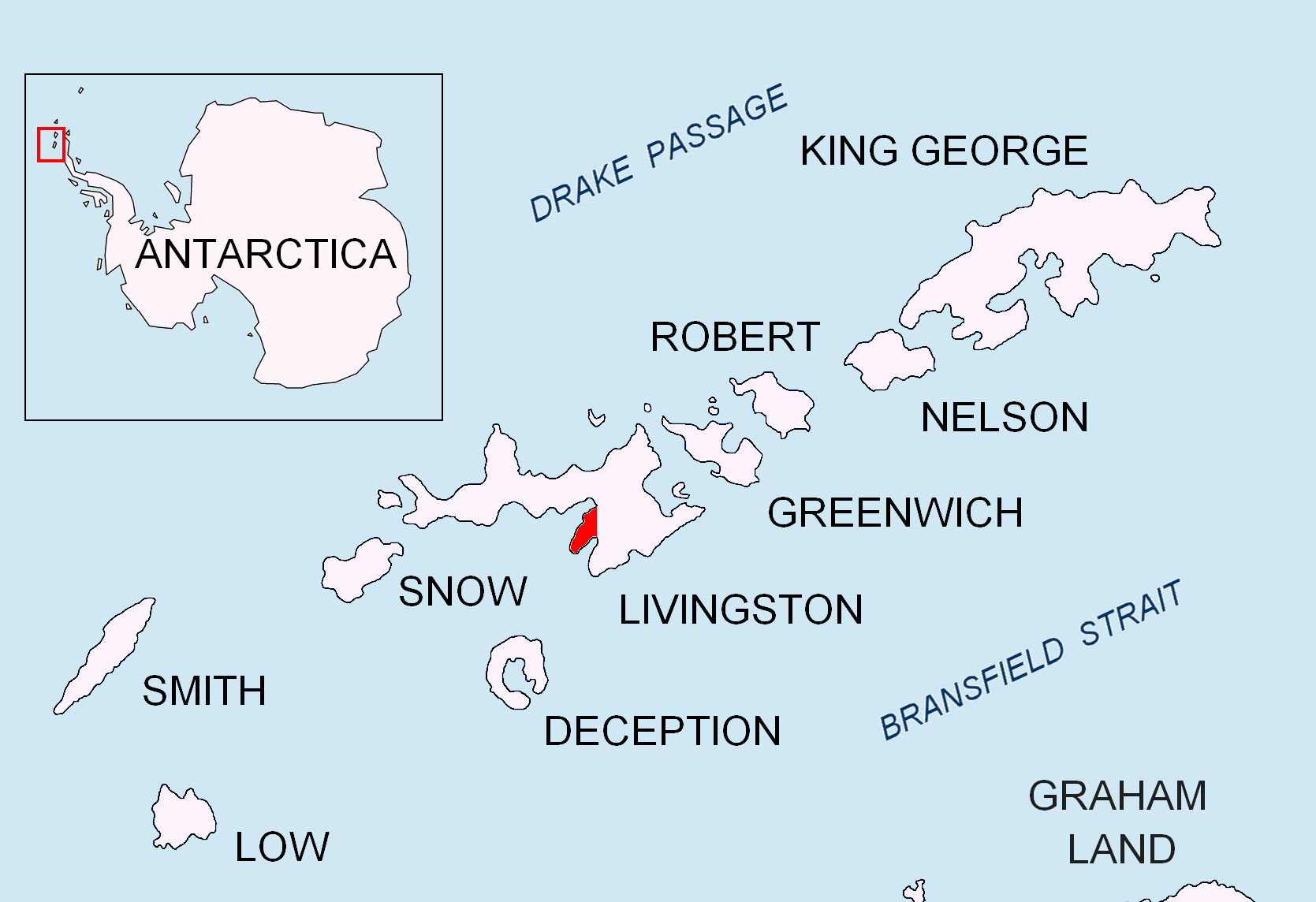
Location of Hurd Peninsula on Livingston Island in the South Shetland Islands.

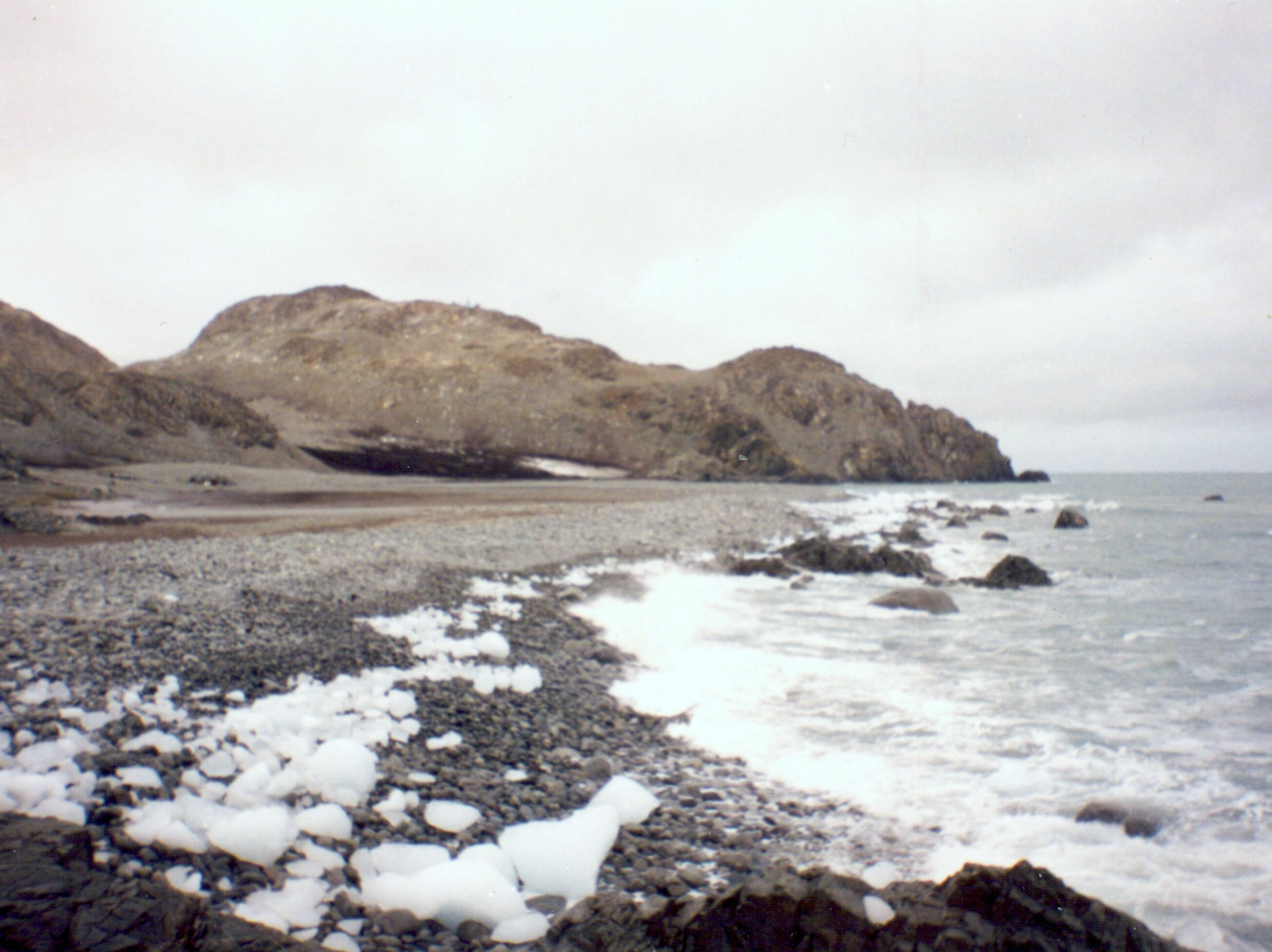
Hesperides Hill from Bulgarian Beach.

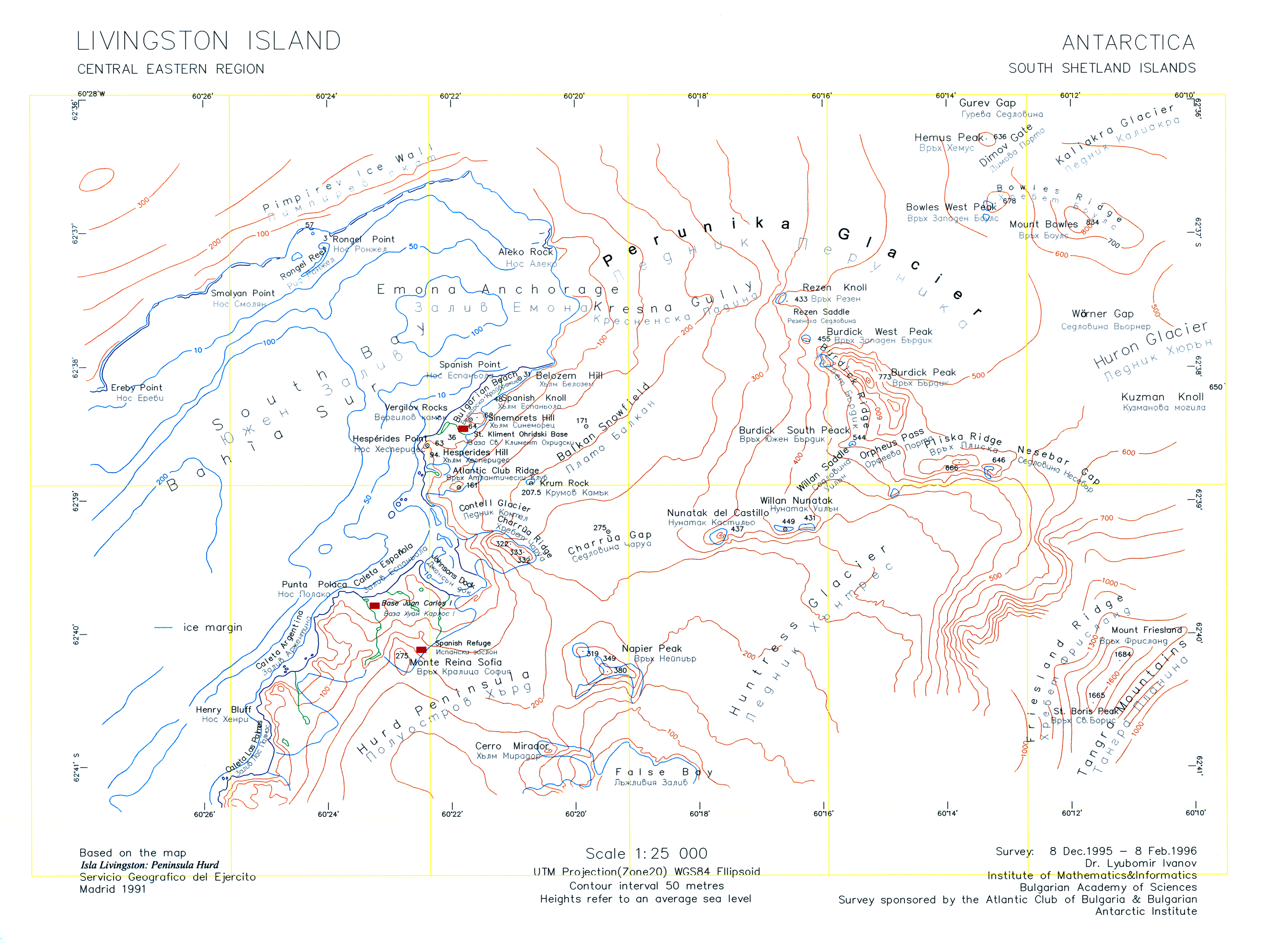
Topographic map of central-eastern Livingston Island featuring Hesperides Hill.

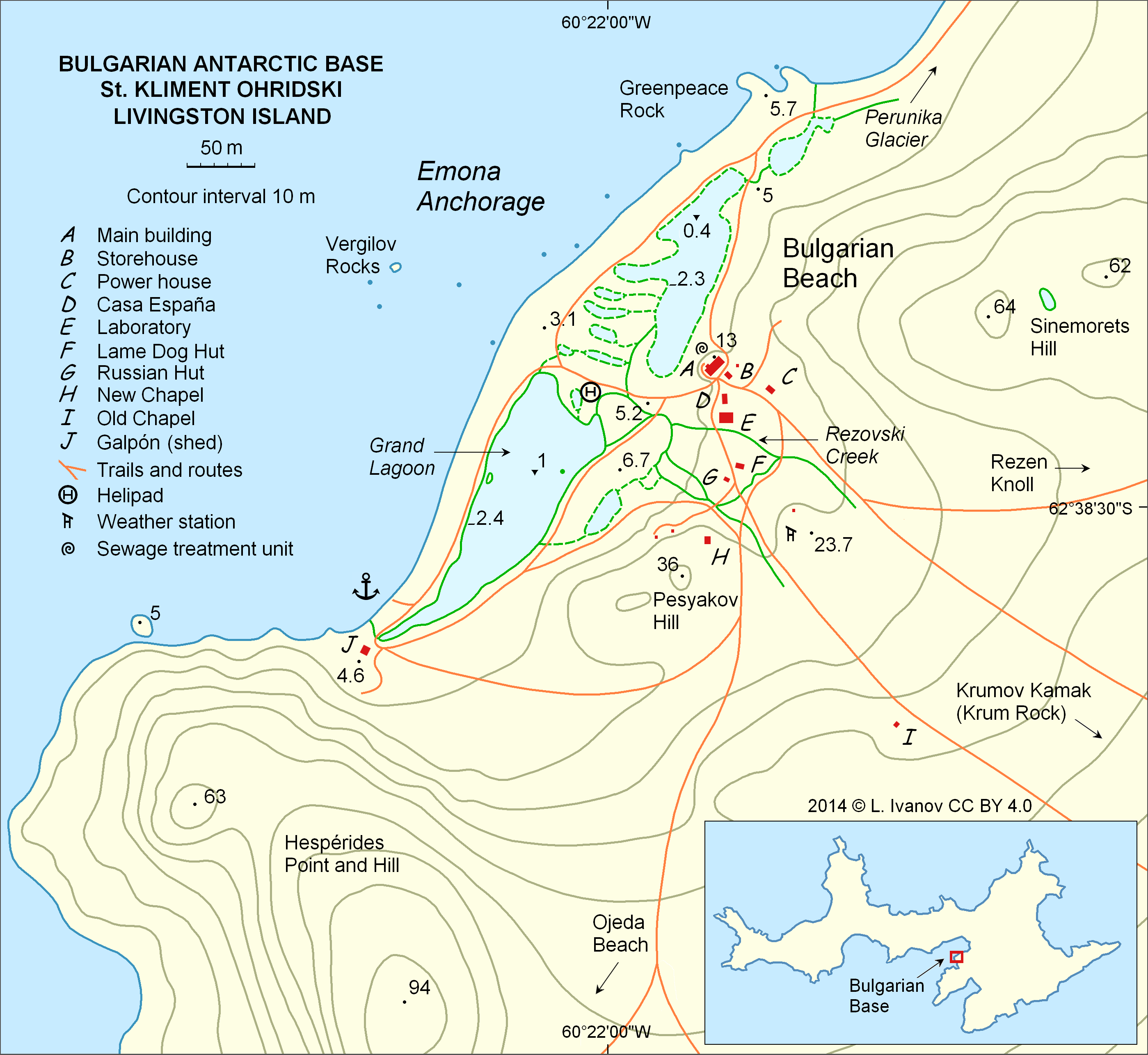
Topographic map of the Bulgarian Base area featuring Hesperides Hill.

Topographic map of Livingston Island and Smith Island.

Hesperides Hill (Halm Hesperides \'h&lm he-spe-'ri-des\) is a ridge linked by a saddle of elevation 52 m with the northern slopes of Atlantic Club Ridge on Hurd Peninsula, eastern Livingston Island in the South Shetland Islands, Antarctica. The hill surmounts the South Bay coast north of Johnsons Dock to the southwest, and Bulgarian Beach to the northeast and is bounded to the southwest by Sea Lion Glacier. The ridge extends 420 m in south-southeast to north-northwest direction and is 250 m wide and narrowing towards north-northwest. Hesperides Hill has two heights, 94 and 63 m, the latter surmounting Hespérides Point. The hill is snow-free in summer months and is named from the adjacent Hespérides Point.

== Location ==
The summit is located at 62°38′42″S 60°22′13″W, which is 690 m southwest of Sinemorets Hill and 510 m northwest by north of Atlantic Club Ridge (mapped in detail by the Spanish Servicio Geográfico del Ejército in 1991. Co-ordinates, elevation and distances given according to a 1995–96 Bulgarian topographic survey).

== Maps ==
- South Shetland Islands. Scale 1:200000 topographic map. DOS 610 Sheet W 62 60. Tolworth, UK, 1968.
- Isla Livingston: Península Hurd. Mapa topográfico de escala 1:25000. Madrid: Servicio Geográfico del Ejército, 1991.
- Islas Livingston y Decepción. Mapa topográfico a escala 1:100000. Madrid: Servicio Geográfico del Ejército, 1991.
- S. Soccol, D. Gildea and J. Bath. Livingston Island, Antarctica. Scale 1:100000 satellite map. The Omega Foundation, USA, 2004.
- L.L. Ivanov et al., Antarctica: Livingston Island and Greenwich Island, South Shetland Islands (from English Strait to Morton Strait, with illustrations and ice-cover distribution), 1:100000 scale topographic map, Antarctic Place-names Commission of Bulgaria, Sofia, 2005
- L.L. Ivanov. Antarctica: Livingston Island and Greenwich, Robert, Snow and Smith Islands. Scale 1:120000 topographic map. Troyan: Manfred Wörner Foundation, 2010. ISBN 978-954-92032-9-5 (First edition 2009. ISBN 978-954-92032-6-4)
- Antarctic Digital Database (ADD). Scale 1:250000 topographic map of Antarctica. Scientific Committee on Antarctic Research (SCAR), 1993–2016.
- Bulgarian Base (Sheet 1 and Sheet 2): Antarctica, South Shetland Islands, Livingston Island. Scale 1:2000 topographic map. Sofia: Military Geographic Service, 2016. (in Bulgarian, map images on slides 6 and 7 of the linked report)
- L.L. Ivanov. Antarctica: Livingston Island and Smith Island. Scale 1:100000 topographic map. Manfred Wörner Foundation, 2017. ISBN 978-619-90008-3-0
