= Tarn (lake) =

Mountain lake or pool in a glacial cirque

Glacial action forming a cirque which may host a tarn

A tarn (or corrie loch) is a mountain lake, pond or pool, formed in a cirque (or "corrie") excavated by a glacier. A moraine may form a natural dam below a tarn.

== Formation ==
Tarns are the result of small glaciers called cirque glaciers. Glacial cirques (or 'corries') form as hollows on mountainsides near the firn line. Eventually, the hollow in which a cirque glacier develops may become a large bowl shape in the side of the mountain, caused by weathering, by ice segregation, and as well as being eroded by plucking. The basin will become deeper as it continues to be eroded by ice segregation and abrasion. A cirque typically will be partially surrounded on three sides by steep cliffs, with a fourth side a form of moraine constructed from glacial till, which forms the lip, threshold or sill, from which either a stream or glacier will flow away from the cirque.

Tarns form from the melting of the cirque glacier. They may either be seasonal features as supraglacial lakes, or permanent features which form in the hollows left by cirques in formerly glaciated areas.

== Etymology ==
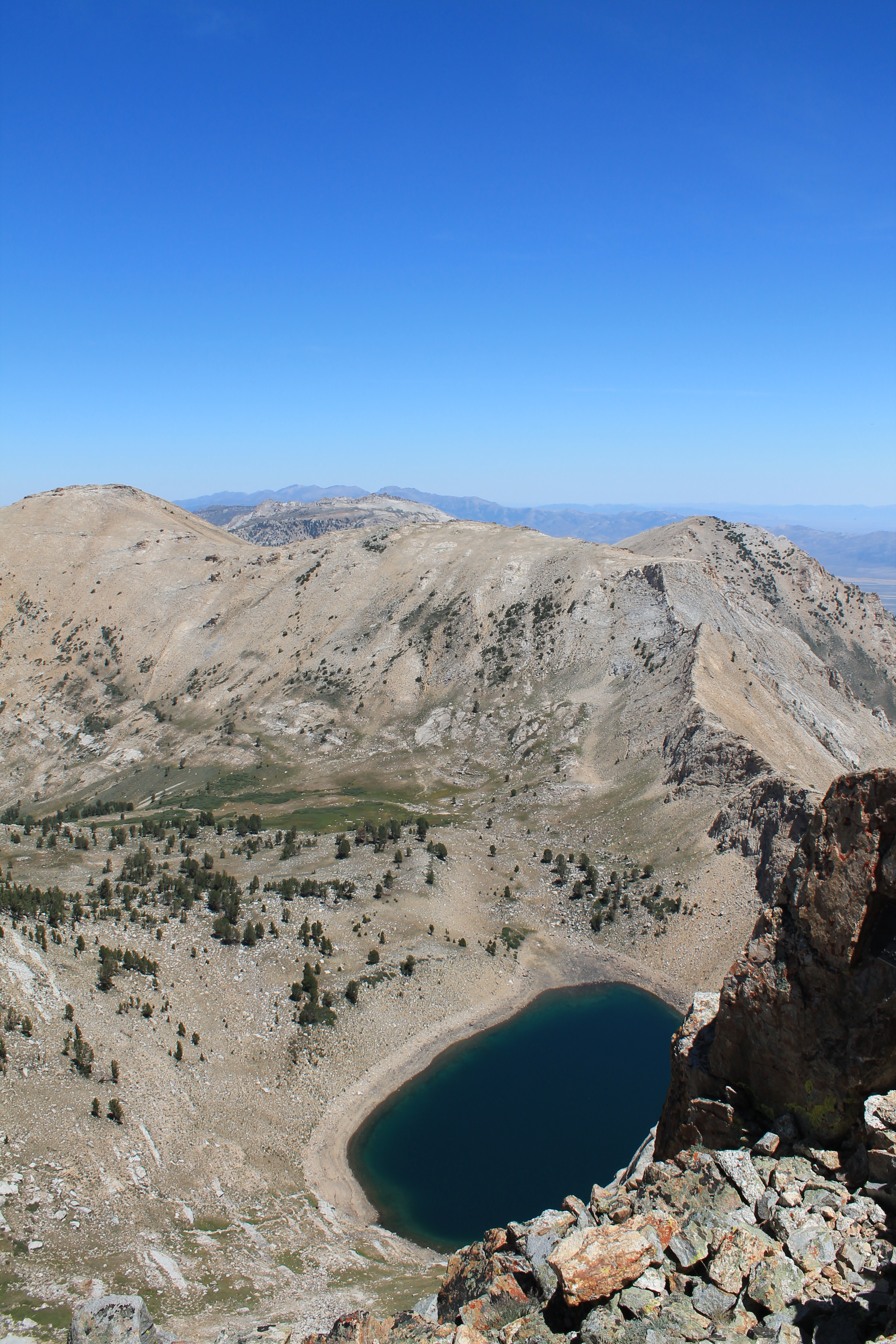
Verdi Lake in the Ruby Mountains of Nevada

The word is derived from the Old Norse word tjörn ("a small mountain lake without tributaries") meaning pond. In parts of Northern England – predominantly Cumberland and Westmorland (where there are 197), but also areas of North Lancashire and North Yorkshire – 'tarn' is widely used as the name for small lakes or ponds, regardless of their location and origin (e.g. Talkin Tarn, Urswick Tarn, Malham Tarn). Similarly, in Scandinavian languages, a tjern or tjørn (both Norwegian) or tjärn or tärn (both Swedish) is a small natural lake, often in a forest or with vegetation closely surrounding it or growing into the tarn. The name of Tjörnin in Reykjavik, Iceland is also from a related word.

The specific technical use for a body of water in a glacial corrie comes from the high number of tarns found in corries in the Lake District, an upland area in North-West England. Nonetheless, there are many more bodies of water called 'tarn' in the Lake District than actually fit this technical use.

The Scots language word shon/shun ("a small loch") may too be derived from Old Norse tjørn, perhaps under the influence of sjø ("sea; fresh water lake").

== Gallery ==
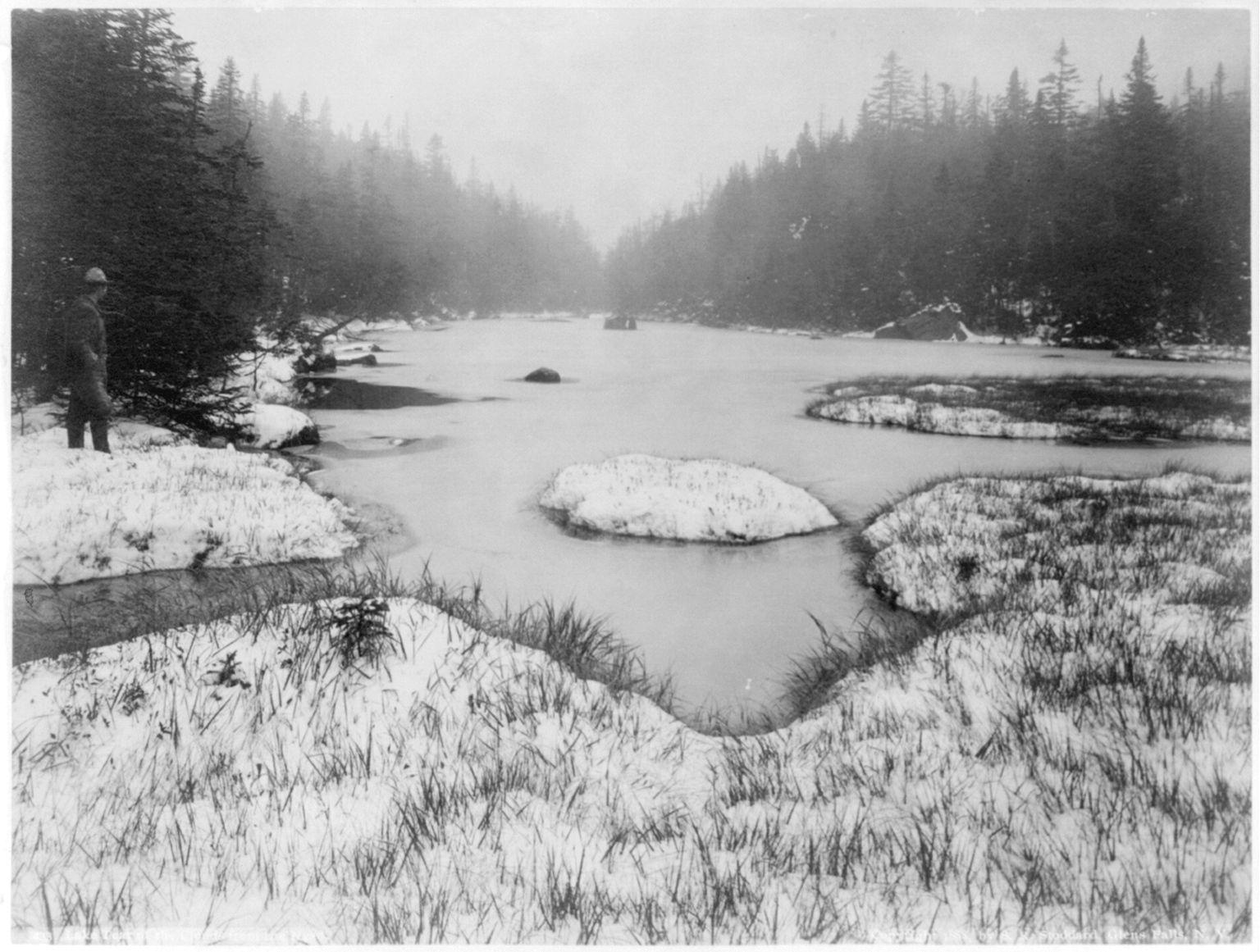
Lake Tear of the Clouds (tarn) in the Adirondack Mountains, New York, photo c. 19th century

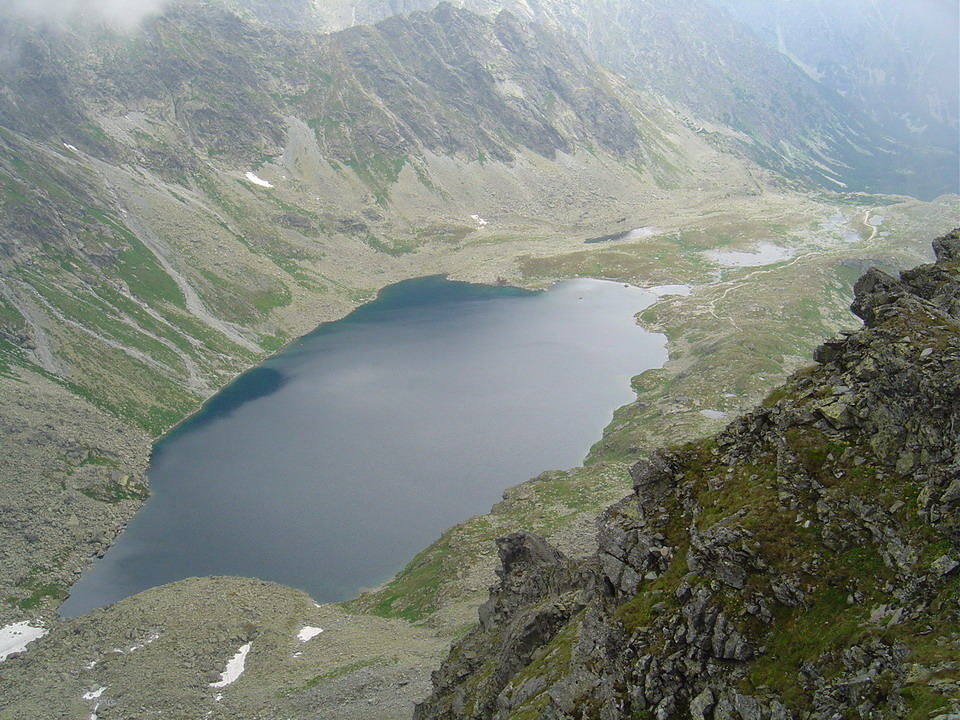
Veľké Hincovo, Tatra Mts, the largest and deepest tarn in Slovakia

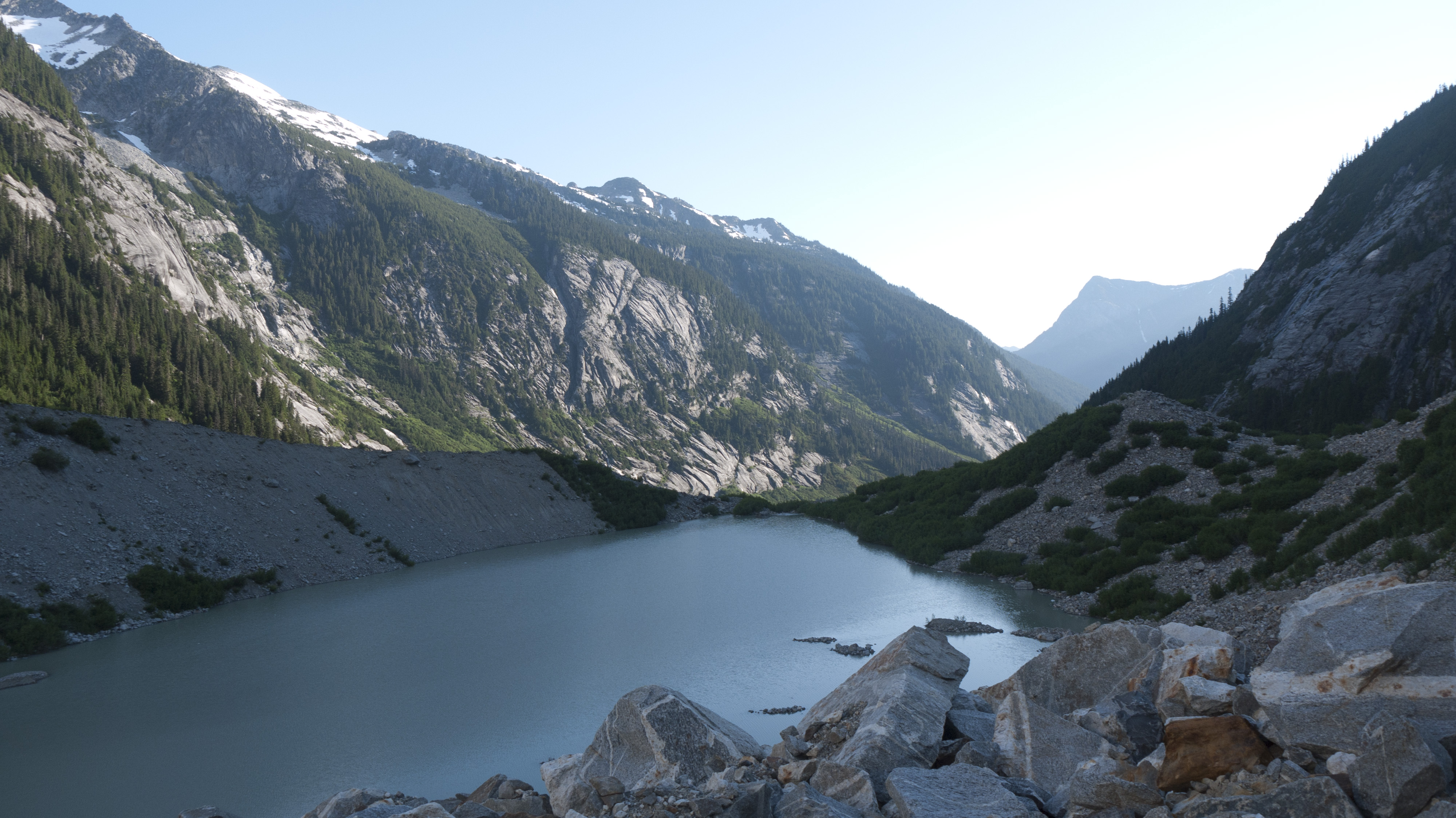
Lousy Lake (tarn) in North Cascades National Park, Picket Range, Washington, USA

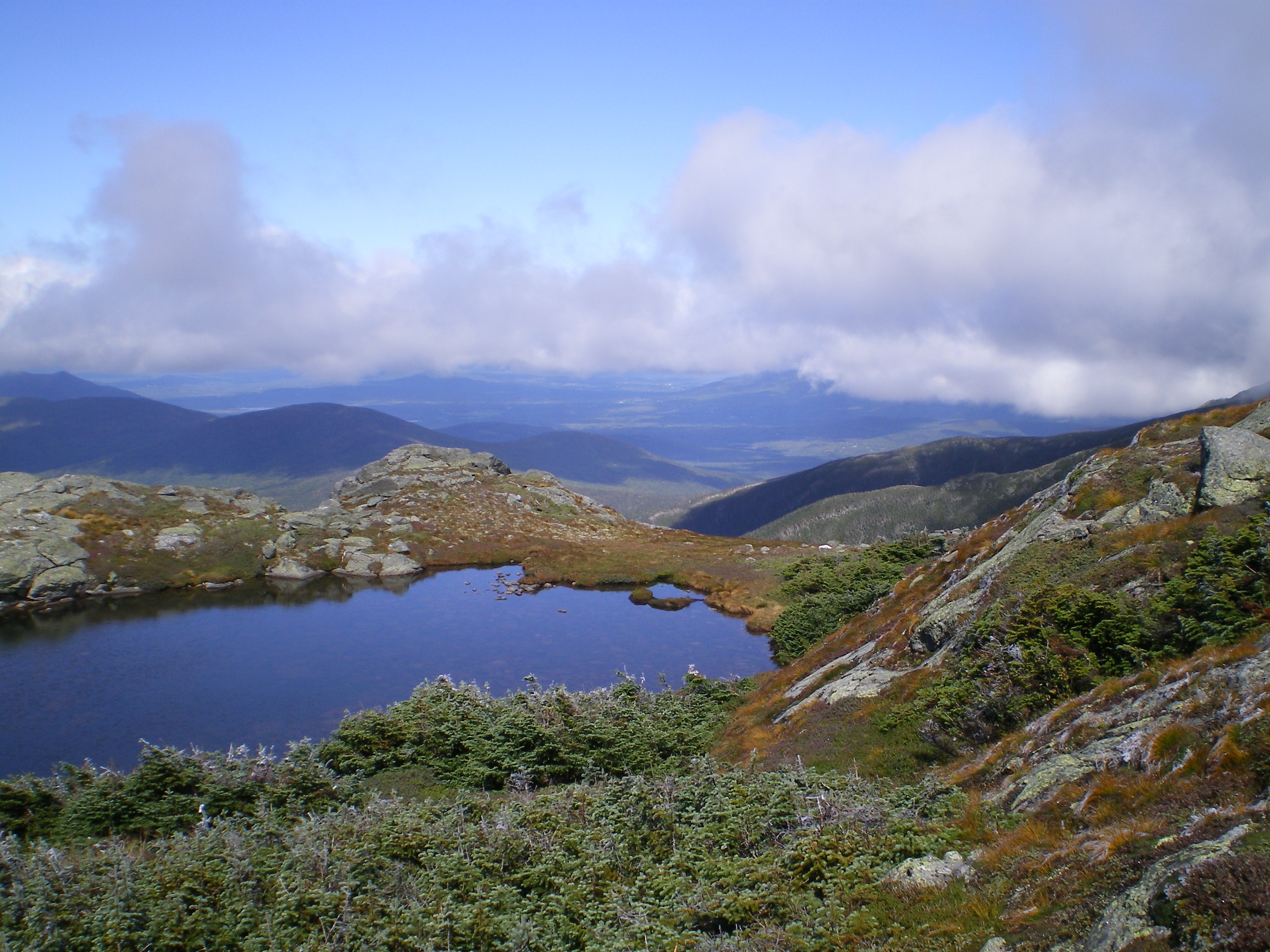
Lakes of the Clouds, below Mount Washington in the White Mountains

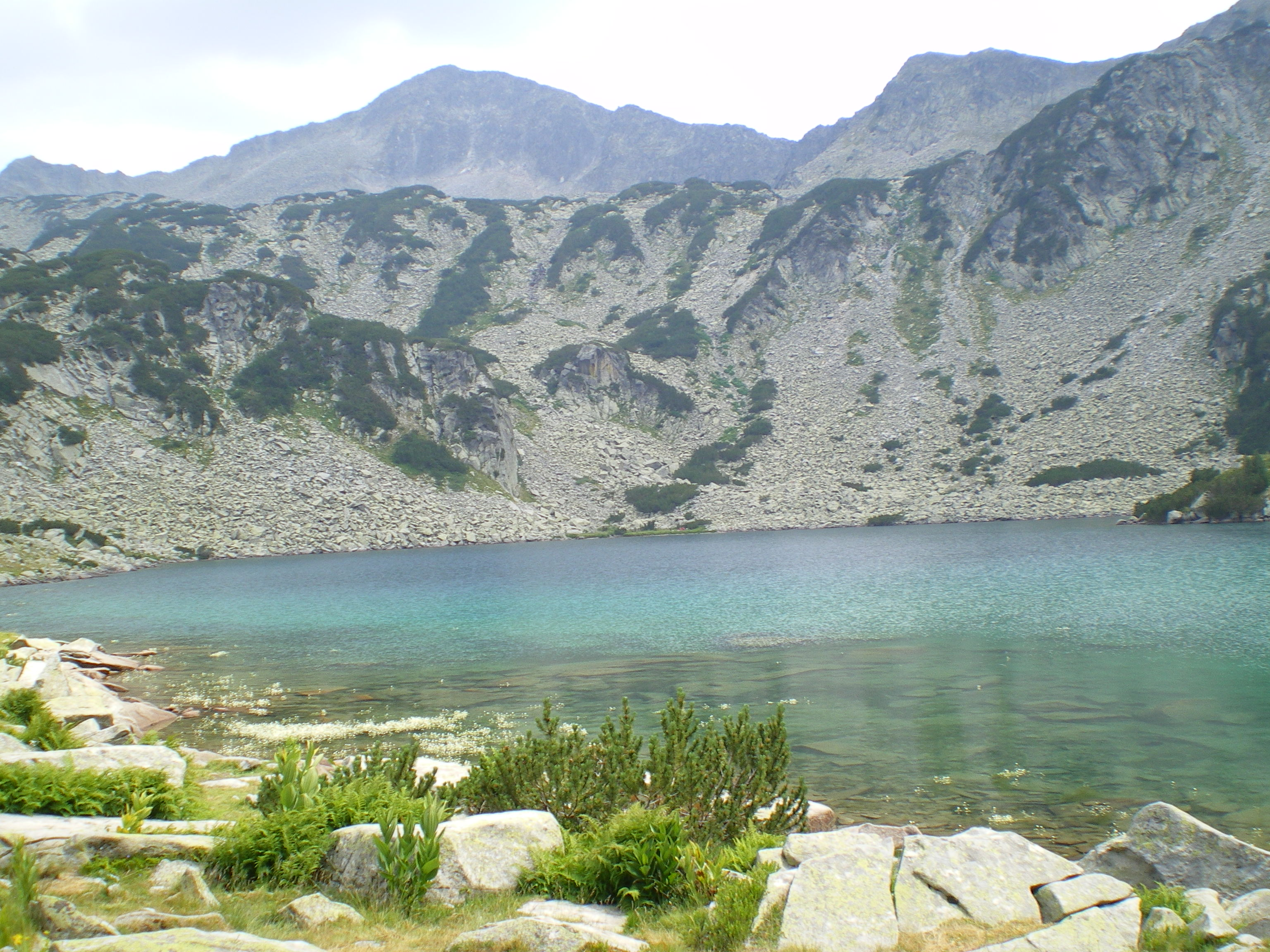
Banderishki Chukar seen from the Banderishki Lakes (tarns), Pirin Mountain, Bulgaria

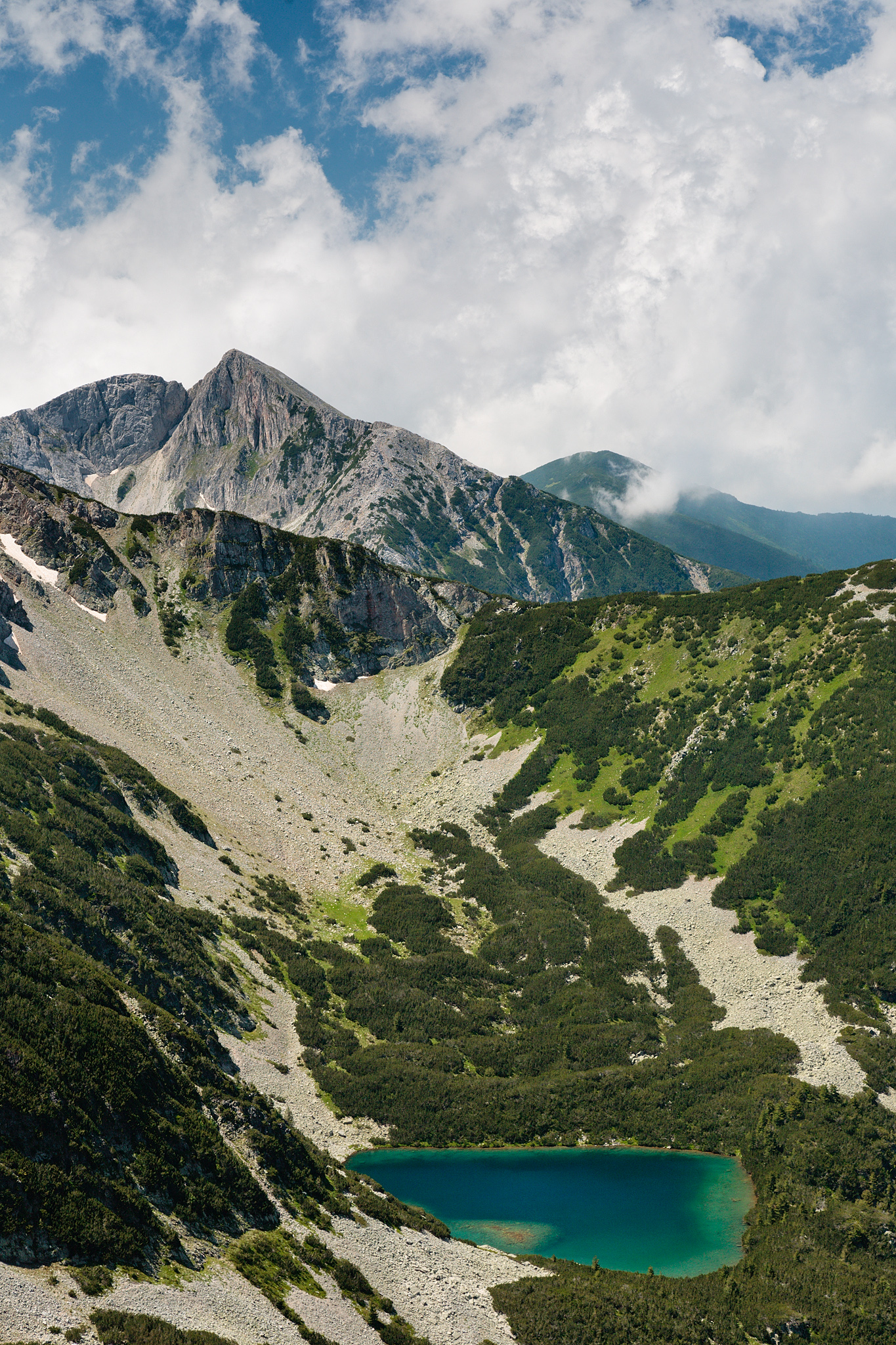
A view to Gergiysko lake (tarn) and Sinanitsa Peak, Pirin Mountain, Bulgaria

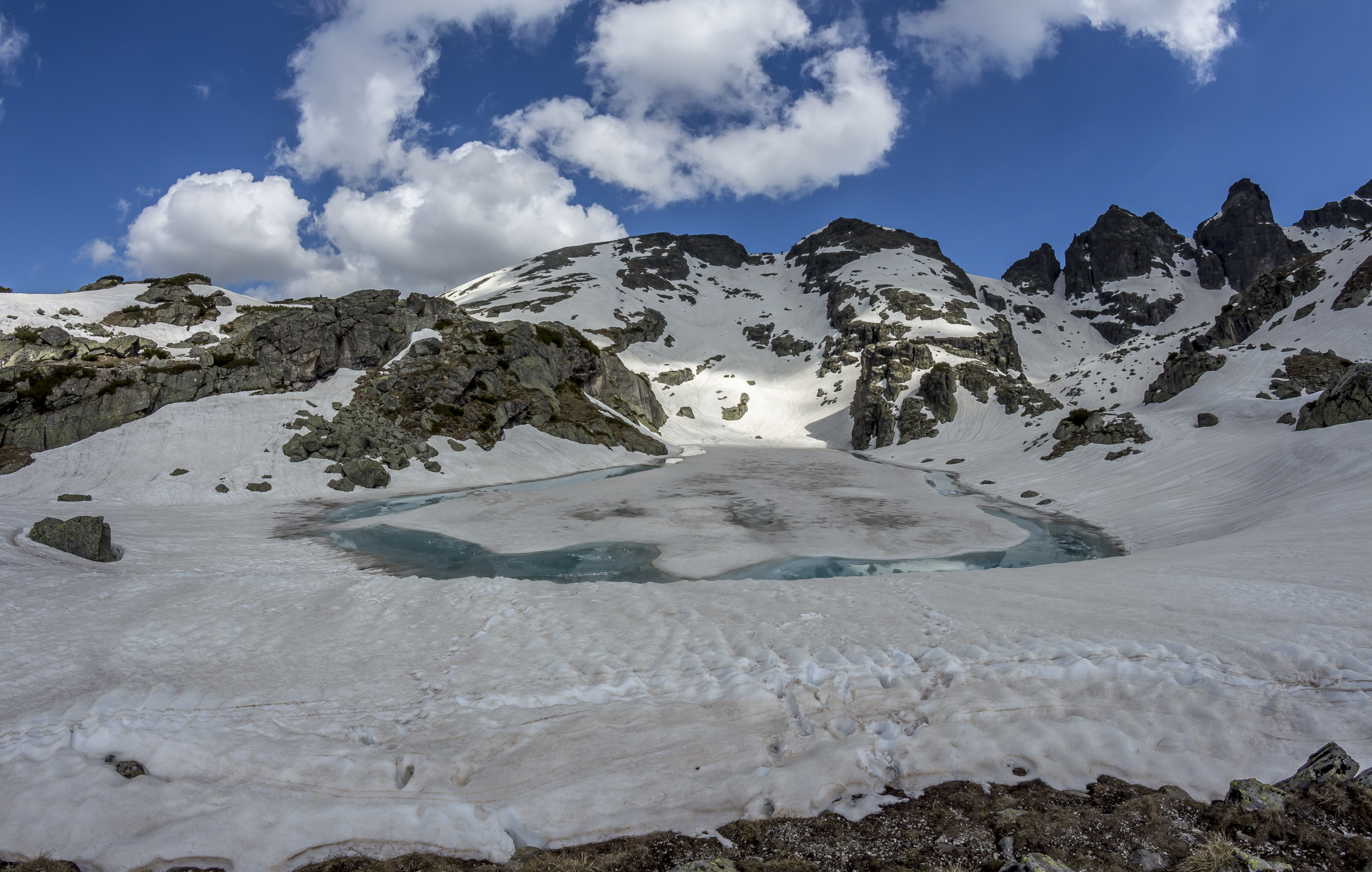
The Dreadful Lake (tarn), Rila Mountain, Bulgaria

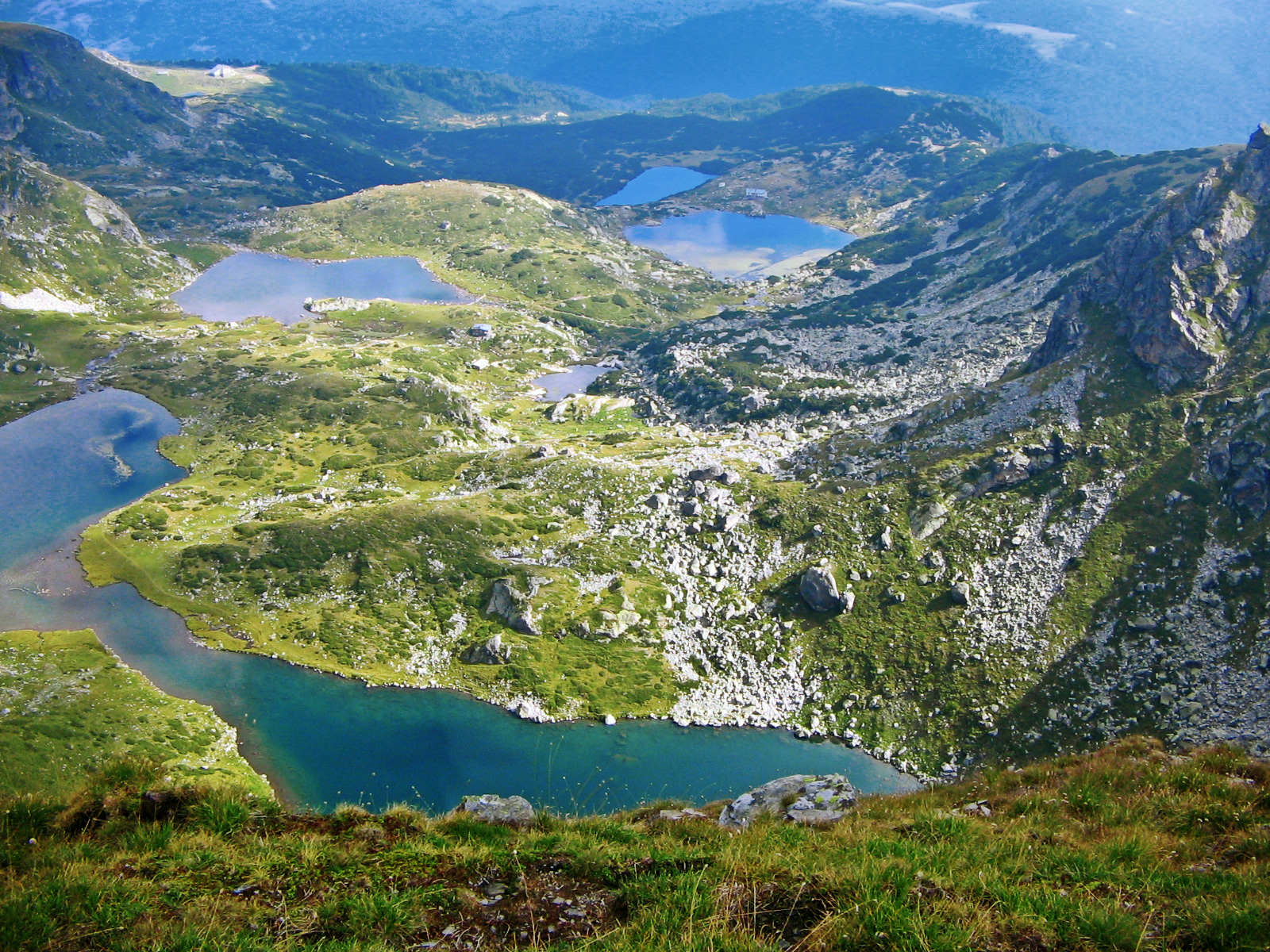
The Seven Rila Lakes (tarns), Rila Mountain, Bulgaria

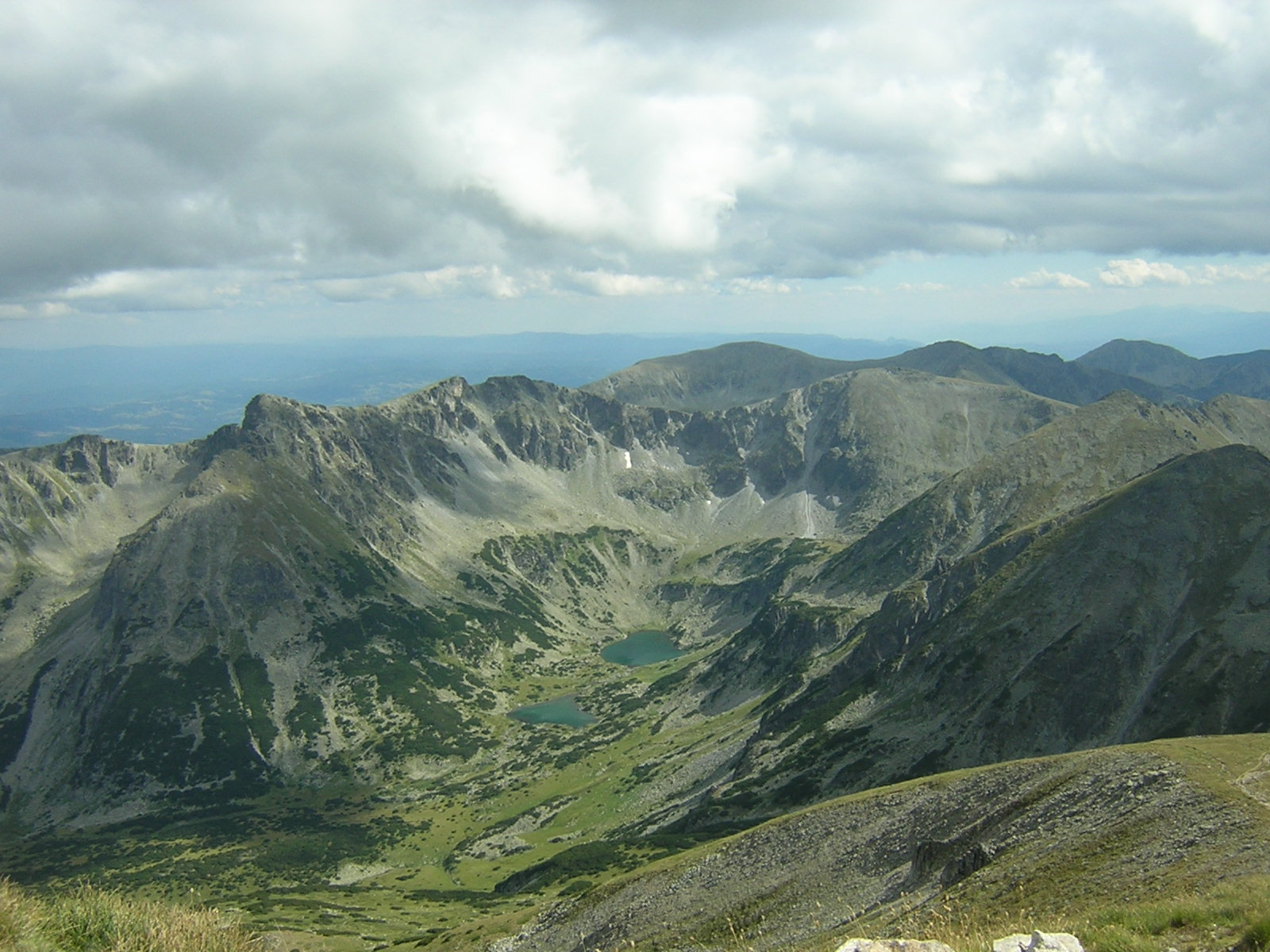
Marichini lakes (tarns), the origin of the Maritsa river seen from Musala peak, Rila Mountain, Bulgaria

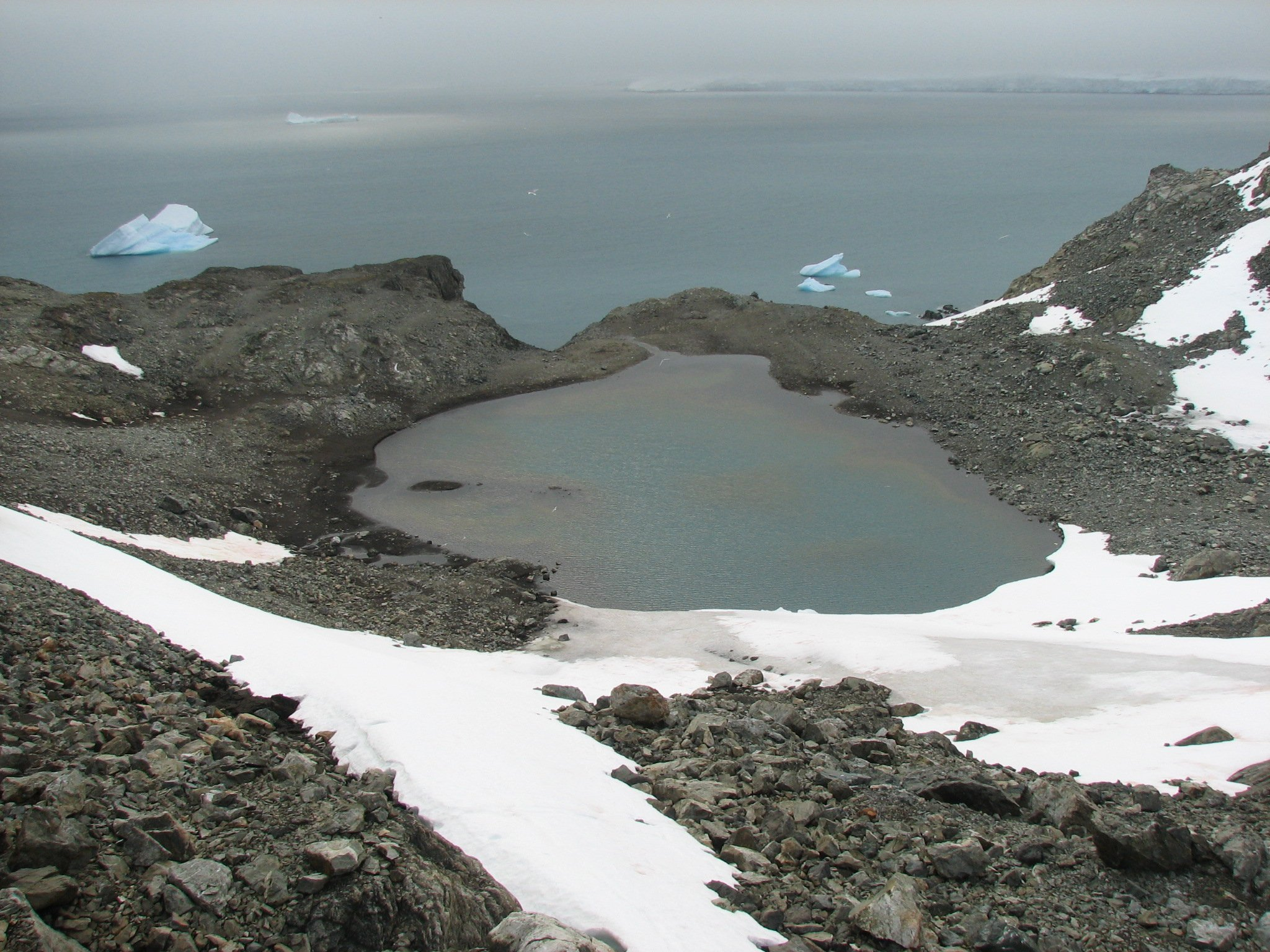
Sea Lion Tarn on Livingston Island in Antarctica

== See also ==
- Pond
- Proglacial lake
- Kettle (landform)
