= Supermarine Sea Lion =

The Supermarine Sea Lions were a series of flying boats built for the Schneider Trophy race.

- Supermarine Sea Lion I, competing for the 1919 Schneider Trophy
- Supermarine Sea Lion II, winner of the 1922 Schneider Trophy
- Supermarine Sea Lion III, the Sea Lion II fitted with a different engine for the 1923 Schneider Trophy
