= Sea Lion Tarn =

Freshwater tarn in the South Shetland Islands, Antarctica

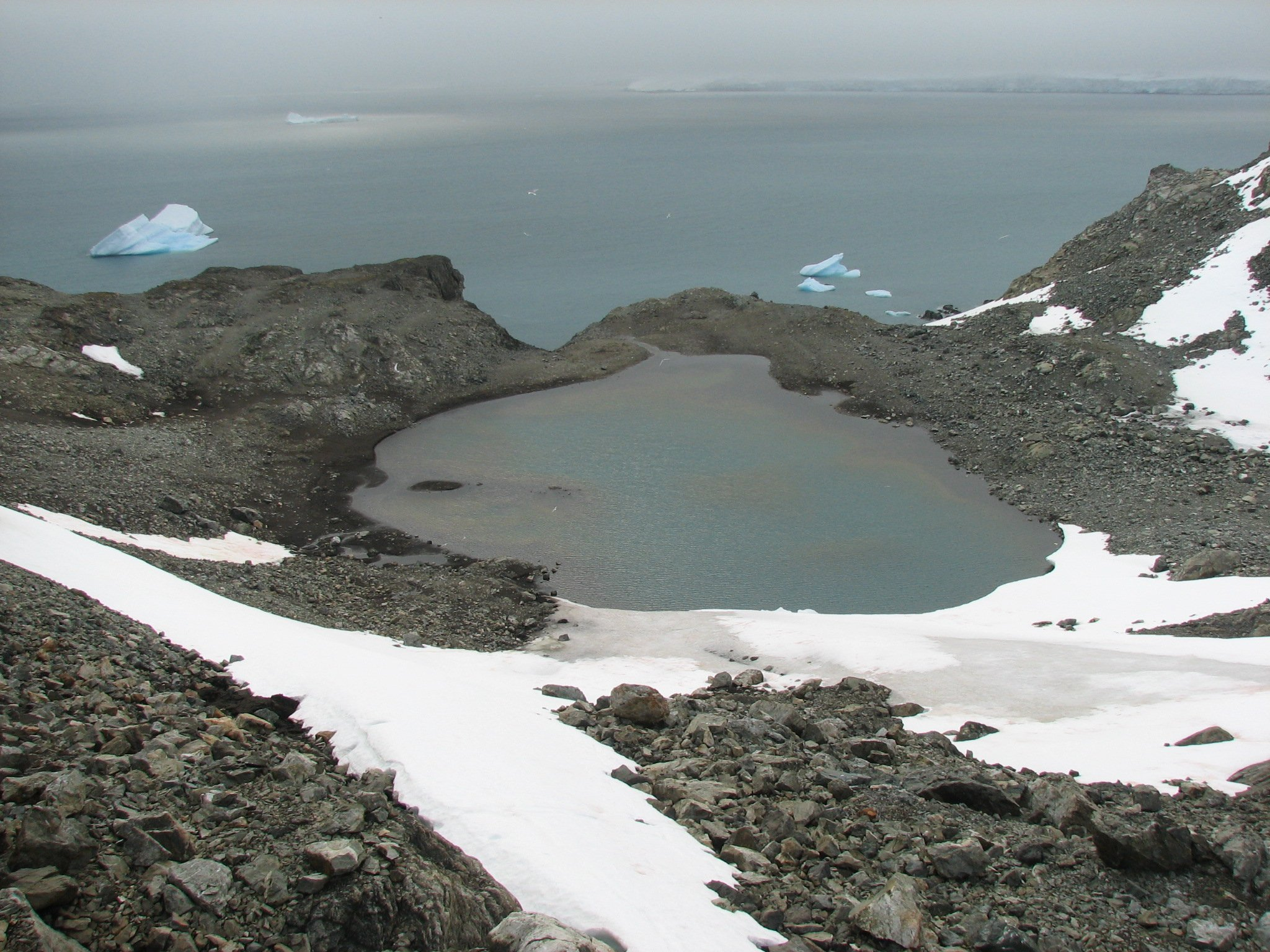
- Sea Lion Tarn from the north slopes of Atlantic Club Ridge, with South Bay in the background

- Location within South Shetland Islands
- Location: Livingston Island
- Coordinates: 62°38′48″S 60°22′14″W
- Basin countries: (Antarctica)
- Surface area: 0.3 ha (0.74 acres)

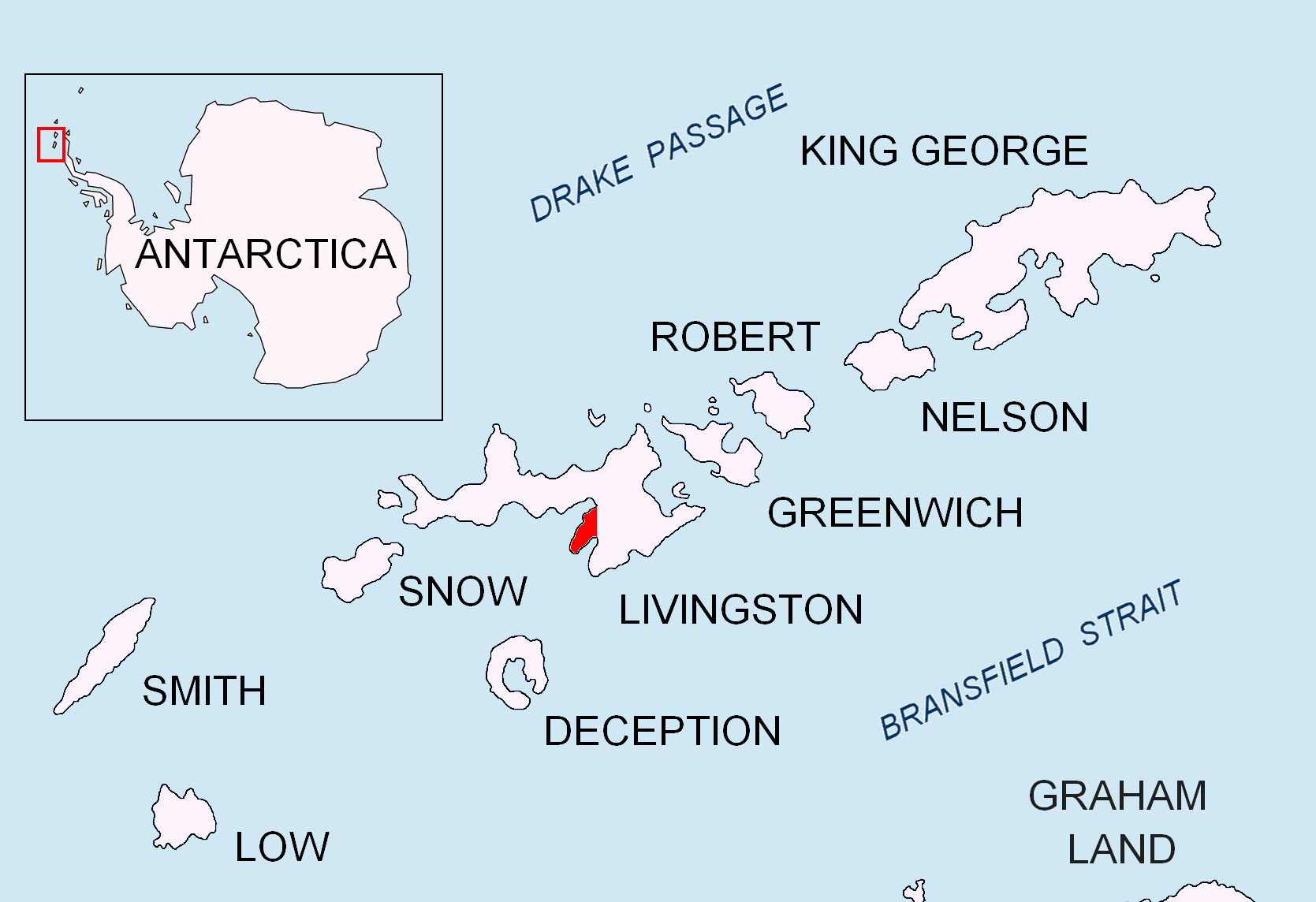
Location of Hurd Peninsula on Livingston Island in the South Shetland Islands.

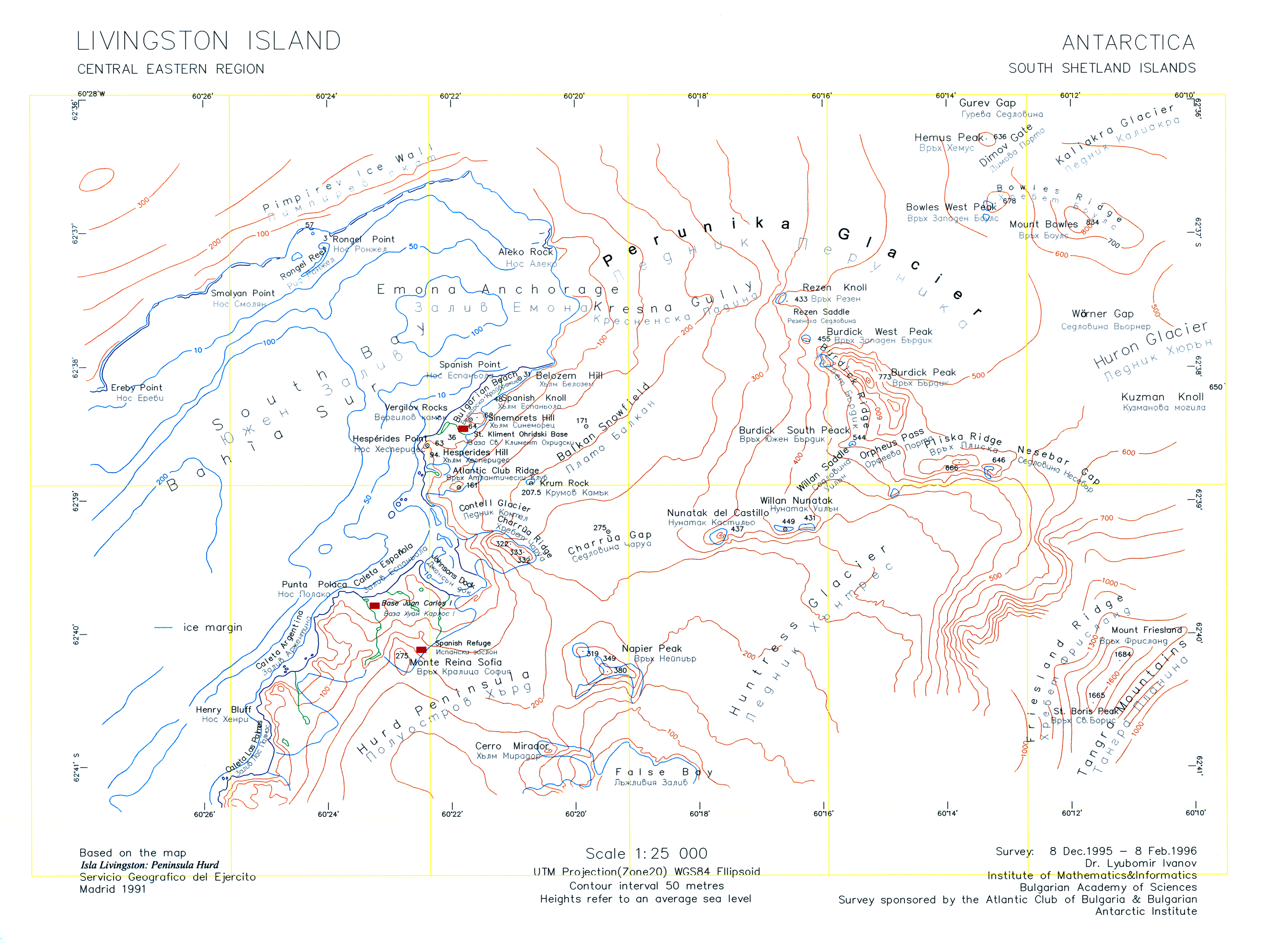
Topographic map of central-eastern Livingston Island featuring Sea Lion Tarn.

Topographic map of Livingston Island and Smith Island

Sea Lion Tarn (Bulgarian: езеро Морски Лъв, romanized: ezero Morski Lav, IPA: [ˈɛzɛro ˈmɔrski ˈɫɤf]) is a freshwater tarn with an area of 0.3 ha (0.74 acres) located between Sea Lion Glacier and the north-western slopes of Atlantic Club Ridge on Hurd Peninsula in eastern Livingston Island in the South Shetland Islands, Antarctica. The lake drains westward through a 100 m creek into South Bay.

The feature takes its name from the adjacent Sea Lion Glacier.

== Location ==
The midpoint is located at 62°38′48″S 60°22′14″W (Bulgarian mapping from a 1995-1996 ground survey).

== Maps ==
- L.L. Ivanov. Livingston Island: Central-Eastern Region. Scale 1:25000 topographic map. Sofia: Antarctic Place-names Commission of Bulgaria, 1996.
- L.L. Ivanov et al. Antarctica: Livingston Island and Greenwich Island, South Shetland Islands. Scale 1:100000 topographic map. Sofia: Antarctic Place-names Commission of Bulgaria, 2005.
- L.L. Ivanov. Antarctica: Livingston Island and Greenwich, Robert, Snow and Smith Islands. Scale 1:120000 topographic map. Troyan: Manfred Wörner Foundation, 2009. ISBN 978-954-92032-6-4
- Antarctic Digital Database (ADD). Scale 1:250000 topographic map of Antarctica. Scientific Committee on Antarctic Research (SCAR). Since 1993, regularly updated.
- L.L. Ivanov. Antarctica: Livingston Island and Smith Island. Scale 1:100000 topographic map. Manfred Wörner Foundation, 2017. ISBN 978-619-90008-3-0
