= Atlantic Club Ridge =

Ridge in Eastern Livingston Island, Antarctica

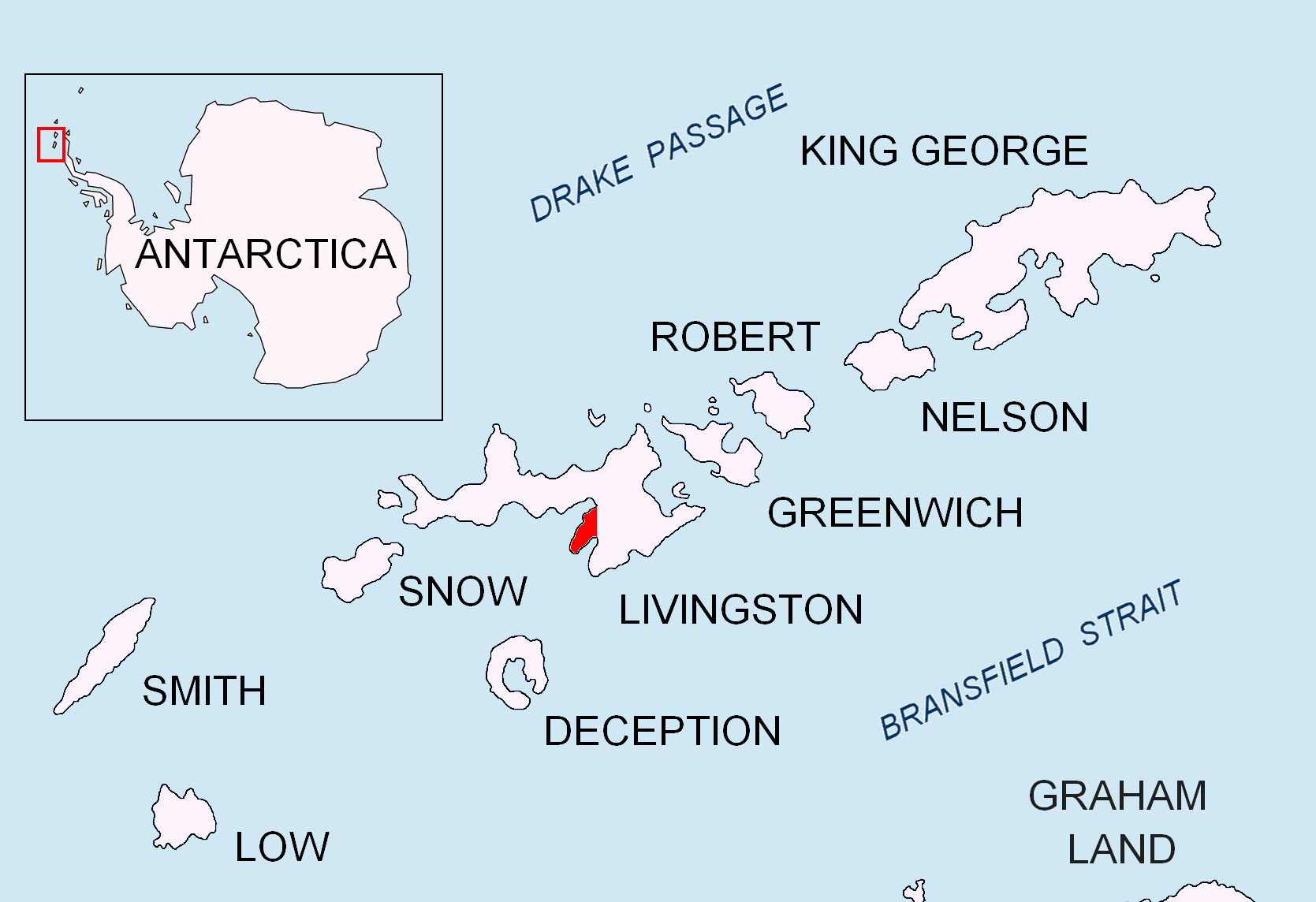
Location of Hurd Peninsula on Livingston Island in the South Shetland Islands.

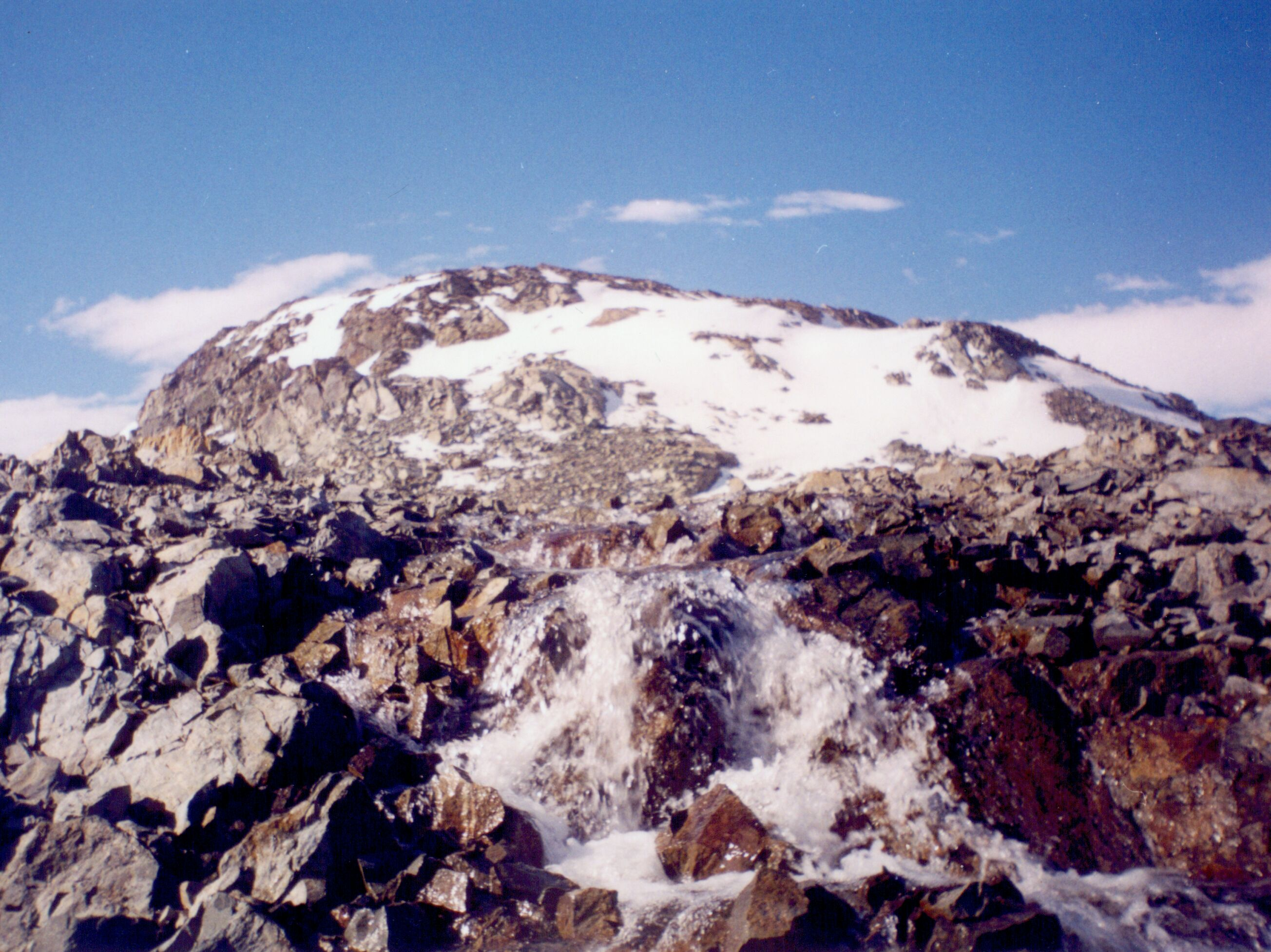
Atlantic Club Ridge

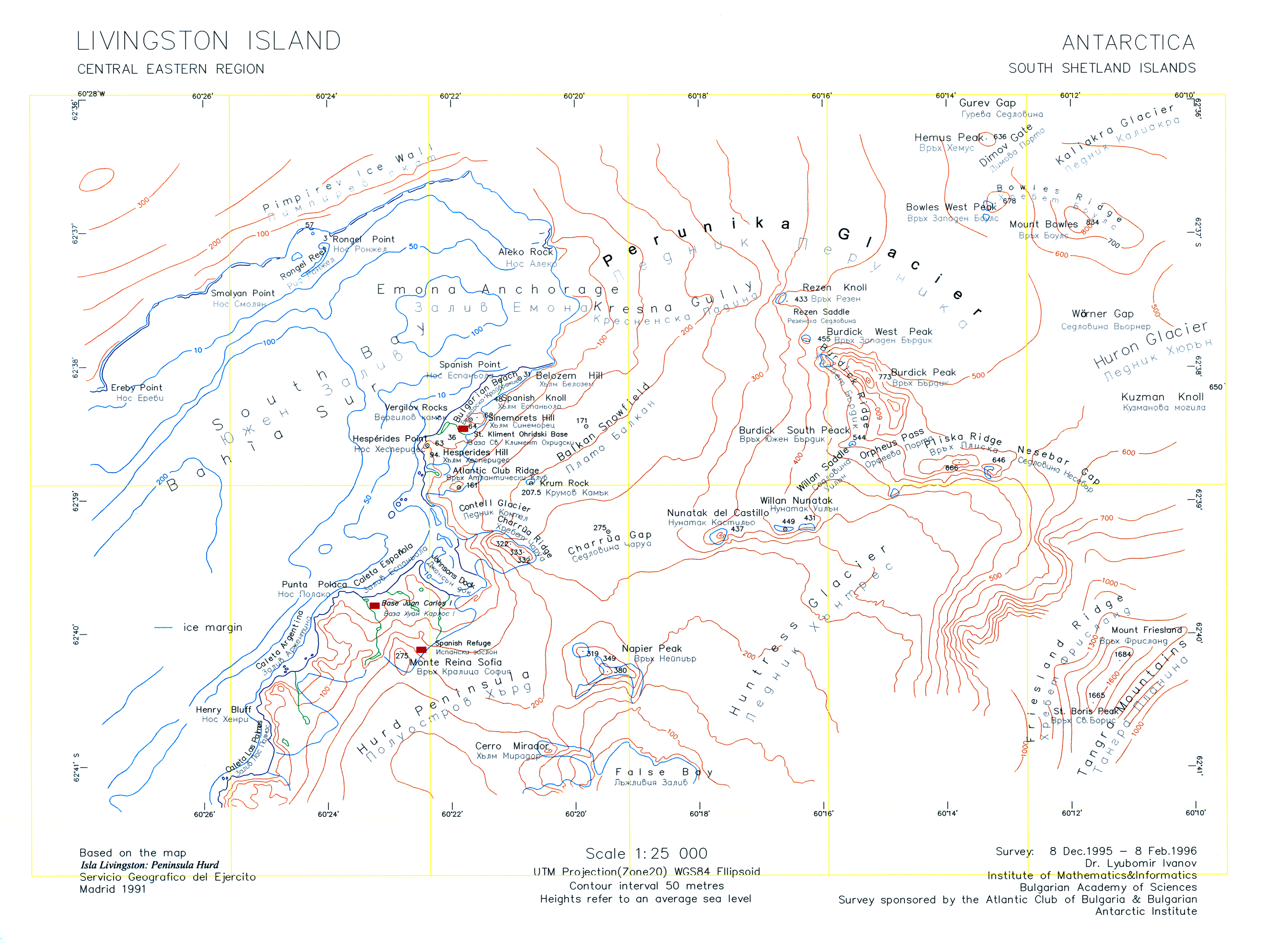
Topographic map of central-eastern Livingston Island featuring Atlantic Club Ridge.

Topographic map of Livingston Island and Smith Island

The Atlantic Club Ridge (Bulgarian: връх Атлантически Клуб, romanized: vrah Atlanticheski Klub, IPA: [ˈvrɤx ɐtɫɐnˈtit͡ʃɛski ˈkɫup]) is a ridge rising to 161 m on Hurd Peninsula in Eastern Livingston Island, Antarctica. To the west the ridge surmounts the South Bay coast north of Johnsons Dock, to the south it is bounded by the lower course of the two km long Contell Glacier, to the east by the foot of the Balkan Snowfield sloping up towards Krum Rock and to the northwest by Sea Lion Tarn. The ridge is snow-free in the summer months.

The ridge's steep northern slopes are linked with Hesperides Hill by a saddle of 52 m elevation. The higher rocky ground on the Atlantic Club Ridge, as well as on the hills surmounting Bulgarian Beach, is noted for its abundant bushy-grown lichens, while moss and Antarctic hair-grass (Deschampsia antarctica) communities thrive on the guano-enriched soil on top of larger rocks at the seaward hill feet.

In commemoration of the co-organizers of the 1993–94, 1994–95, and 1995–96 Bulgarian Antarctic campaigns the name Atlantic Club was originally applied in 1994 to the neighbouring glacier but, due to priority of the existing Spanish name (Glaciar Contell), the name was subsequently transferred to the present feature.

== Location ==
The feature is 600 m long and 350 m wide, trending east by northeast to west by southwest, and is located at 62°38′56″S 60°21′54″W which is 730 m southeast of Hespérides Point, 950 m southwest of Sinemorets Hill and 1.29 km northwest of the highest point of Charrúa Ridge (333 m).

The ridge was mapped in detail by the Spanish Servicio Geográfico del Ejército in 1991.

== See also ==
- List of Bulgarian toponyms in Antarctica
- Antarctic Place-names Commission

== Maps ==
- Isla Livingston: Península Hurd. Mapa topográfico de escala 1:25000. Madrid: Servicio Geográfico del Ejército, 1991. (Map reproduced on p. 16 of the linked work)
- L.L. Ivanov. Livingston Island: Central-Eastern Region. Scale 1:25000 topographic map. Sofia: Antarctic Place-names Commission of Bulgaria, 1996.
- L.L. Ivanov et al., Antarctica: Livingston Island and Greenwich Island, South Shetland Islands (from English Strait to Morton Strait, with illustrations and ice-cover distribution), 1:100000 scale topographic map, Antarctic Place-names Commission of Bulgaria, Sofia, 2005
- L.L. Ivanov. Antarctica: Livingston Island and Greenwich, Robert, Snow and Smith Islands. Scale 1:120000 topographic map. Troyan: Manfred Wörner Foundation, 2010. ISBN 978-954-92032-9-5 (First edition 2009. ISBN 978-954-92032-6-4)
- Antarctica, South Shetland Islands, Livingston Island: Bulgarian Antarctic Base. Sheets 1 and 2. Scale 1:2000 topographic map. Geodesy, Cartography and Cadastre Agency, 2016. (in Bulgarian)
- Antarctic Digital Database (ADD). Scale 1:250000 topographic map of Antarctica. Scientific Committee on Antarctic Research (SCAR). Since 1993, regularly upgraded and updated.
- L.L. Ivanov. Antarctica: Livingston Island and Smith Island. Scale 1:100000 topographic map. Manfred Wörner Foundation, 2017. ISBN 978-619-90008-3-0

== Bibliography ==
- J. Stewart. Antarctica: An Encyclopedia. Jefferson, N.C. and London: McFarland, 2011. 1771 pp. ISBN 978-0-7864-3590-6
