= USS Sealion =

Two submarines of the United States Navy have been named USS Sealion for the sea lion, any of several large, eared seals native to the Pacific.

- USS Sealion (SS-195), a Sargo-class submarine was wrecked and scuttled in the first days of World War II.
- USS Sealion (SS-315), a Balao-class submarine, served with distinction from the second half of World War II through first half of the Cold War.
